This article contains a list of knights of the Order of the Golden Fleece.

Knights of the Burgundian Golden Fleece

15th Century

!Year of Induction!!Name!!Born!!Died!!Notes
|-
|rowspan=25|1430||Philip the Good, Duke of Burgundy||1396||1467||Founder and First Head of the Order
|-
|Guillaume de Vienne, Seigneur de Saint-George||1360||1435|| 
|-
|Regnier Pot, Seigneur de la Prugne||?||1432|| 
|-
|Jehan, Seigneur de Roubaix||1369||1449|| 
|-
|Roland d'Uutkercke, Seigneur de Hemsrode||?||1442|| 
|-
|Antoine de Vergy, Comte de Dammartin||?||1439|| 
|-
|David de Brimeu, Seigneur de Ligny||?||1451|| 
|-
|Hue de Lannoy, Seigneur de Santes||1384||1456|| 
|-
|Jehan, Seigneur de Comines||?||1442|| 
|-
|Antoine de Toulonjon||?||1432||Marshal of Burgundy
|-
|Pierre de Luxembourg, Comte de Saint-Pol||1390||1433|| 
|-
|Jehan de la Trémoille, Seigneur de Jonvelle||c. 1377||1449|| 
|-
|Guilbert de Lannoy, Seigneur de Villerval||1386||1462|| 
|-
|Jehan de Luxembourg, Comte de Ligny||1385||1440|| 
|-
|Jehan de Villers, Seigneur de l'Isle-Adam||?||1439|| 
|-
|Antoine de Croy, Comte de Porcéan||1390||1475|| 
|-
|Florimond de Brimeu, Seigneur de Massincourt||?||1441|| 
|-
|Robert, Seigneur de Masmines||?||1431|| 
|-
|Jacques de Brimeu, Seigneur de Grigny||?||before 1451|| 
|-
|Baudouin de Lannoy, Seigneur de Molembaix||1388||1474|| 
|-
|Pierre de Bauffremont, Comte de Charny||?||1473|| 
|-
|Philippe, Seigneur de Ternant||1400||1456|| 
|-
|Jehan de Croy, Comte de Chimay||1395||1473|| 
|-
|Jehan, Seigneur de Créqui||1397||1473|| 
|-
|Jehan de Neufchâtel, Seigneur de Montagu||?||1433|| 
|-
|rowspan=2|1431||Frédéric, Comte de Meurs||1392||1451|| 
|-
|Simon de Lalaing, Seigneur de Santes||1405||1476|| 
|-
|rowspan=2|1432||André de Toulonjon||?||1432|| 
|-
|Jehan de Melun, Seigneur d'Antoing||1398||1484|| 
|-
|rowspan=8|1433||Jacques, Seigneur de Crèvecoeur||?||1436|| 
|-
|Jehan de Vergy, Seigneur de Fouvans||1378||1460|| 
|-
|Guy de Pontailler, Seigneur de Tallemé||?||1463|| 
|-
|Baudot de Noyelles-Wion, Seigneur de Casteau||?||1468|| 
|-
|Jean bâtard de Luxembourg, Seigneur de Hautbourdin||?||1466|| 
|-
|Charles of Burgundy, Comte de Charolais||1433||1477||succeeded his father Philip as Duke of Burgundy in 1467; second head of the order
|-
|Ruprecht, Comte de Virnebourg||?||1443|| 
|-
|Thibaut de Neufchâtel||1396||1461|| 
|-
|rowspan=4|1440||Charles, Duc d'Orléans||1391||1465|| 
|-
|Jean VI, Duc de Bretagne||1389||1442|| 
|-
|Jean II, Duc d'Alençon||1409||1476|| 
|-
|Mathieu de Foix-Comminges||1385||1453|| 
|-
|rowspan=6|1445||Alfonso V, King of Aragon and Naples||1394||1458|| 
|-
|Franck de Borsele, Comte d'Ostrevant||1394||1473|| 
|-
|Reinoud II van Brederode||1415||1473|| 
|-
|Henry de Borsele, Seigneur de Vere||1405||1470|| 
|-
|Jean IV, Seigneur d'Auxy||1396||1474|| 
|-
|André, Seigneur d'Humières||1403||1460|| 
|-
|rowspan=6|1451||John I, Duke of Cleves||1419||1481|| 
|-
|Juan de Guevara, Count of Ariano||?||1456|| 
|-
|Pedro de Cardona, Count of Colisano||?||1451|| 
|-
|Jehan, Seigneur de Lannoy||1410||1493|| 
|-
|Jacques de Lalaing, Seigneur de Bugincourt||1421||1453|| 
|-
|Jehan de Neufchâtel, Seigneur de Montagu||?||?|| 
|-
|rowspan=5|1456||Giosia I Acquaviva, Count of Terrano||?||1462|| 
|-
|Jean de Bourgogne, Duc de Nevers||1415||1491|| 
|-
|Antoine, bastard of Burgundy||1422||1504|| 
|-
|Adolph of Cleves, Lord of Ravenstein||1425||1492|| 
|-
|Prince John of Portugal, Duke of Coimbra||1433||1457|| 
|-
|rowspan=6|1461||Juan II, King of Aragon and Navarre||1397||1479|| 
|-
|Adolf the Young, Duke of Gelders||1438||1477|| 
|-
|Thiebault de Neufchâtel, Marshal of Burgundy||1413||1469|| 
|-
|Philippe Pot, Seigneur de La Roche de Nolay||1428||1493|| 
|-
|Loys of Gruuthuse||1427||1492|| 
|-
|Guy, Seigneur de Roye||?||1463|| 
|-
|rowspan=8|1468||Edward IV, King of England||1442||1483|| 
|-
|Louis of Chalon, Seigneur de Château-Guyon||1448||1476|| 
|-
|Jean de Damas, Seigneur de Clessy||?||?|| 
|-
|Jacques de Bourbon||1445||1468|| 
|-
|Jacques de Luxembourg, Seigneur de Richebourg||1426||1487|| 
|-
|Philippe de Savoie, Comte de Bresse||1443||1497|| 
|-
|Philippe de Crèvecoeur, Seigneur des Cardes||?||1494|| 
|-
|Claude de Montagu, Seigneur de Couches||?||1470|| 
|-
|rowspan=7|1473||Ferdinand V, King of Castile||1452||1516|| 
|-
|Ferdinand I, King of Naples||1423||1494|| 
|-
|Jean de Rubempré, Seigneur de Bièvres||?||1477|| 
|-
|Philippe de Croy, Comte de Chimay||1395||1483|| 
|-
|Jean de Luxembourg, Comte de Marle||1437||1476|| 
|-
|Guy de Brimeu, Seigneur de Humbercourt||?||1477|| 
|-
|Engelbert II, Count of Nassau||1451||1504|| 
|-
|rowspan=2|1474||Johan Rengers ten Post, Lord of Scharmer and Dijksterhuis||±1410||1494|| 
|-
|Unico II, Baron Ripperda von Farmsum||±1413||?||

Knights of the Habsburg Golden Fleece

15th Century

!Year of Induction!!Name!!Born!!Died!!Notes
|-
|rowspan=9|1478||Archduke Maximilian I of Austria||1459||1519||husband to Marie, Charles the Bold's daughter and heir. Head of the Order until her death in 1482
|-
|William II of Egmont||1412||1483|| 
|-
|Wolfart de Borsele, Seigneur de Vere||1430||1487|| 
|-
|Joost de Lalaing, Seigneur de Montigny||1437||1483|| 
|-
|Jacques de Luxembourg, Seigneur de Fiennes||1443||1517|| 
|-
|Philippe de Bourgogne, Seigneur de Beveren||c. 1450||1498|| 
|-
|Peter II de Luxembourg, Count of Saint-Pol||1440||1483|| 
|-
|Jacques de Savoie, Comte de Romont||1450||1486|| 
|-
|Bertrem, Seigneur de Liechtenstein||?||?|| 
|-
|rowspan=8|1481||Philip the Fair, Comte de Charolais||1479||1506||eldest son of Maximilian I and Marie; head of the order 1482–1506
|-
|Jean, Seigneur de Ligne||1435||1491|| 
|-
|Pierre de Hennin, Seigneur de Boussu||1433||1490|| 
|-
|Baudouin de Lannoy, Seigneur de Molembaix||1436||1501|| 
|-
|Guillaume de la Baume, Seigneur d'Irlain||?||1516|| 
|-
|Jean III, Seigneur de Berghes||1452||1531|| 
|-
|Martin, Seigneur de Polheim||?||1498|| 
|-
|Claude de Toulonjon, Seigneur de la Bastie||?||?|| 
|-
|rowspan=14|1491||Frederick III, Holy Roman Emperor||1415||1493||father to Maximilian I and grandfather to Philip
|-
|Henry VII, King of England||1457||1509|| 
|-
|Albert III, Duke of Saxony||1443||1500|| 
|-
|Henri de Witthem, Seigneur de Beersel||1440||1515|| 
|-
|Pierre de Lannoy, Seigneur de Fresnoy||1445||1510|| 
|-
|Eberhard V, Count of Württemberg||1445||1496|| 
|-
|Claude de Neufchâtel, Seigneur de Fay||?||1505|| 
|-
|Jean I, Comte d'Egmont||1439||1516|| 
|-
|Christopher, Margrave of Baden-Hachberg||1453||1527|| 
|-
|Jean, Seigneur de Cruninghen||1460||1513|| 
|-
|Charles de Croy, 1st Prince of Chimay||1455||1527|| 
|-
|Guillaume de Croy, Seigneur de Chièvres||1458||1521|| 
|-
|Hugues de Melun, Vicomte de Gand||1454||1524|| 
|-
|Jacques de Luxembourg, Seigneur de Fiennes||?||1535||

16th Century

!Year of Induction!!Name!!Born!!Died!!Notes
|-
|rowspan=8|1501||Charles of Ghent, Comte de Charolais||1500||1558||eldest son of Philip the Fair. Head of the Order from 1506 to 1555
|-
|Wolfgang von Polheim||1458||1512|| 
|-
|Eitelfried II, Count of Zollern||1458||1512|| 
|-
|Corneille de Berghes, Seigneur de Zevenberghe||1458||1516|| 
|-
|Philippe bâtard de Bourgogne, Bishop of Utrecht||1466||1542|| 
|-
|Michel de Croy, Seigneur de Sempy||?||1516|| 
|-
|Jean de Luxembourg, Seigneur de Ville||?||1508|| 
|-
|Philibert II, Duke of Savoy||1480||1504|| 
|-
|rowspan=10|1505||Henry, Prince of Wales||1491||1547||later King Henry VIII of England
|-
|Paul von Liechtenstein||?||?|| 
|-
|Charles I de Lalaing||1466||1525|| 
|-
|Wolfgang von Fürstenberg||1465||1509|| 
|-
|Juan Manuel.Señor de Belmonte||?||1535|| 
|-
|Floris d'Egmont, Count of Buren||1469||1539|| 
|-
|Jacques III, Comte de Hornes||?||1530|| 
|-
|Henry III, Count of Nassau-Breda||1483||1538|| 
|-
|Ferry de Croy, Seigneur de Roeulx||?||1524|| 
|-
|Philibert, Seigneur de Vere||?||1512|| 
|-
|rowspan=25|1515||Francis I, King of France||1494||1547|| 
|-
|Archduke Ferdinand of Austria||1503||1564||younger brother of Charles V, later Holy Roman Emperor
|-
|Frederick II, Elector Palatine||1482||1556|| 
|-
|John V of Brandenburg-Ansbach||1493||1525|| 
|-
|Guy de la Baume, Comte de Montrevel||?||1516|| 
|-
|Hoyer VI, Comte de Mansfeld||1484||1540|| 
|-
|Laurent de Gorrevod, Comte de Pont de Vaux||?||1527|| 
|-
|Philippe de Croy, 1st Duc d'Aerschot||1496||1549|| 
|-
|Jacques de Gavre, Seigneur de Frezin||?||1537|| 
|-
|Antoine de Croy, Seigneur de Tour-sur-Marne et Sempy||?||1546|| 
|-
|Antoine de Lalaing, Comte de Hoogstraten||1480||1540|| 
|-
|Charles de Lannoy, Seigneur de Senzeille||1482||1527|| 
|-
|Adolphe de Bourgogne, Seigneur de Beveren||1489||1540|| 
|-
|Philibert of Châlon, Prince of Orange||1502||1530|| 
|-
|Felix, Count of Werdenberg||?||1530|| 
|-
|Manuel I, King of Portugal||1469||1521|| 
|-
|Louis II, King of Hungary and Bohemia||1506||1526|| 
|-
|Michael von Wolkenstein||?||1523|| 
|-
|Maximilien de Hornes, Seigneur de Gaesbeek||?||1542|| 
|-
|Guillaume, Seigneur de Ribaupierre||1468||1547|| 
|-
|Jean III, baron de Trazegnies||1470||1550|| 
|-
|Jean van Wassenaar, Vicomte de Leyden||1483||1523|| 
|-
|Maximilien de Berghes, Seigneur de Zevenbergen||?||1545|| 
|-
|François de Melun, Comte d'Espinoy||?||1547|| 
|-
|Jean, Comte d'Egmont||1499||1528|| 
|-
|rowspan=14|1519||Fadrique Alvarez de Toledo, 2nd Duke of Alva||c. 1460||1531|| 
|-
|Diego Lopez de Pacheco, 2nd Duke of Escalona||1456||1529|| 
|-
|Diego Hurtado de Mendoza, 3rd Duke of l'Infantado||1461||1531|| 
|-
|Íñigo Fernández de Velasco, 2nd Duke of Frías||1460||1528|| 
|-
|Alvaro de Zuniga y Guzman, 2nd Duke of Béjar||1455||1531|| 
|-
|Antonio Manrique de Lara, 2nd Duke of Najera||1466||1535|| 
|-
|Fernando Ramon Folch, 2nd Duke of Cardona||c. 1470||1543|| 
|-
|Pietro Antonio San Severino, Duke of San Marco||?||?|| 
|-
|Fadrique Enriquez de Cabrera, 2nd Count of Melgar||1466||1538|| 
|-
|Alvaro Perez Osorio, 3rd Marquis of Astorga||?||1523|| 
|-
|Christian II, King of Denmark, Norway, and Sweden||1481||1559|| 
|-
|Sigismund I of Poland||1467||1548|| 
|-
|Jacques de Luxembourg, Comte de Gavre||?||1530|| 
|-
|Adrien de Croy, Comte de Roeulx||?||1555|| 
|-
|rowspan=24|1531||John III, King of Portugal||1502||1557||Charles V's brother-in-law
|-
|James V, King of Scots||1512||1542|| 
|-
|Ferdinando d'Aragon, Duke of Calabria||1488||1550|| 
|-
|Pedro Fernandez de Velasco, 3rd Duke of Frias||1485||1559|| 
|-
|Philip, Duke of Bavaria||1503||1548|| 
|-
|George, Duke of Saxony||1471||1539|| 
|-
|Beltran II de la Cueva y Toledo, 3rd Duke of Albuquerque||1477||1560|| 
|-
|Andrea Doria, 1st Prince of Melfi||1466||1560|| 
|-
|Philip of Austria, Prince of Asturias||1527||1598||Charles V's eldest son, later Philip II of Spain. Head of the order from 1555
|-
|Reinoud III van Brederode||1492||1556|| 
|-
|Ferrante Gonzaga, Duke of Ariano||1507||1557|| 
|-
|Nicholas, Count of Salm||1503||1550|| 
|-
|Claude de la Baume, Seigneur de Mont-Saint-Sorlin||?||1541|| 
|-
|Antoine, Marquis de Berghes||1503||1567|| 
|-
|Jean de Hennin, 1st Comte de Boussu||1480||1562|| 
|-
|Charles, 2nd Comte de Lalaing||1506||1558|| 
|-
|Louis de Flandres, Seigneur de Praet||1488||1555|| 
|-
|Georges Schenck, Seigneur de Tautenburg||1480||1540|| 
|-
|Philippe de Lannoy, Vicomte de Sebourg||1460||1535|| 
|-
|Philippe de Lannoy, Seigneur de Molembaix||1487||1543|| 
|-
|Alfonso d'Avalos d'Aquino, Marquis del Vasto||1502||1546|| 
|-
|Francisco de Zuñiga, 3rd Count of Miranda||?||1536|| 
|-
|Maximilien d'Egmont, Count of Büren||1509||1548|| 
|-
|René de Châlons, Prince of Orange||1518||1544|| 
|-
|rowspan=21|1546||Archduke Maximilian of Austria||1527||1576||eldest son of Charles's brother, King Ferdinand. Later Holy Roman Emperor Maximilian II
|-
|Iñigo Lopez de Mendoza, 4th Duke of l'Infantado||1503||1566|| 
|-
|Fernando Alvarez de Toledo, 3rd Duke of Alva||1508||1582|| 
|-
|Cosimo I de' Medici, Duke of Florence||1519||1574||later became the first Grand Duke of Tuscany
|-
|Albert V, Duke of Bavaria||1528||1579|| 
|-
|Emmanuel Philibert, Prince of Piedmont||1528||1580||later Duke of Savoy
|-
|Ottavio Farnese, Duke of Parma||1524||1586|| 
|-
|Juan Esteban Manrique de Lara, 3rd Duke of Najera||1504||1558|| 
|-
|Friedrich von Fürstenberg||1496||1559|| 
|-
|Philippe de Lannoy, 2nd Prince of Sulmone||1514||1553|| 
|-
|Joachim, Seigneur de Rye||?||?|| 
|-
|Ponthus de Lalaing, Seigneur de Bugnicourt||1508||1558|| 
|-
|Lamoral d'Egmont, Prince de Gavre||1522||1568|| 
|-
|Claude de Vergy, Comte de Gruères||1495||1560|| 
|-
|Jacques, Comte de Ligne||?||1552|| 
|-
|Maximilien de Bourgogne, Marquis de Vere||1514||1558|| 
|-
|Peter Ernest, Count of Mansfeld||1517||1604|| 
|-
|Jean de Ligne, Comte d'Arenberg||1525||1568|| 
|-
|Pierre de Barbançon, Stadtholder of Hainault||1500||1557|| 
|-
|Jean de Lannoy, Seigneur de Molembaix||1509||1560|| 
|-
|Pedro Fernández de Córdoba, 4th Count of Feria||1518||1552|| 
|-
|rowspan=19|1555||Henry II, Duke of Brunswick-Wolfenbüttel||1489||1568|| 
|-
|Archduke Ferdinand of Austria, Margrave of Burgau||1529||1595||second son of Emperor Ferdinand I
|-
|Philippe de Croy, 3rd Duc d'Aerschot||1521||1595|| 
|-
|Gonzalo II Fernández de Córdoba (1520-1578)||1520||1578|| 
|-
|Don Carlos of Spain||1545||1568||eldest son of King Philip II
|-
|Luis Enriquez de Cabrera, 2nd Duke of Medina de Rioseco||?||1572|| 
|-
|Alfonso de Aragon, 3rd Duke of Cardona||?||1562|| 
|-
|Charles, Baron de Berlaymont||1510||1578|| 
|-
|Philippe de Stavele, Baron de Chaumont||1508||1562|| 
|-
|Charles de Brimeu, Comte de Meghem||1524/25||1572|| 
|-
|Philippe de Montmorency, Count of Horn||1518||1568|| 
|-
|Jean IV, Marquis de Berghes||1528||1567|| 
|-
|William I, Prince of Orange||1533||1584|| 
|-
|Jean de Montmorency, Siegneur de Courrière||?||1563|| 
|-
|Johan I of East Frisia||1506||1572|| 
|-
|Wratislaw von Pernstein||1530||1582|| 
|-
|Francisco Fernando d'Avalos d'Aquino, 5th Marquis of Pescara||?||1571|| 
|-
|Antonio Doria, Marquis of San Stefano||?||?|| 
|-
|Ascanio Sforza-Sforza, Count of Santa Fiora||1520||1575|| 
|-
|rowspan=9|1559||Guidobaldo de Montefeltre, Duke of Urbino||1514||1574|| 
|-
|Marco-Antonio Colonna, Prince of Tagliacozza||1535||1584|| 
|-
|Philippe de Montmorency, Seigneur d'Achricourt||1502||1566|| 
|-
|Baudouin de Lannoy, Seigneur de Molembaix||1518||1559|| 
|-
|Guillaume de Croy, Marquis de Renty||1527||1565|| 
|-
|Floris de Montmorency, Seigneur de Montigny||1528||1567|| 
|-
|Philippe, 2me Comte de Ligne||1533||1583|| 
|-
|Charles de Lannoy, 5th Prince of Sulmone||1537||1568|| 
|-
|Antoine de Lalaing, 3rd Comte de Hoogstraten||1535||1568|| 
|-
|1560||Francis II, King of France||1544||1560|| 
|-
|1561||Joachim von Neuhaus||?||1584|| 
|-
|1565||Charles IX, King of France||1550||1574|| 
|-
|1566||Don John of Austria||1547||1578||illegitimate son of Charles V; later the victor of Lepanto
|-
|1573||Eric II, Duke of Brunswick||1528||1584|| 
|-
|rowspan=2|1581||Joao, Duke of Braganza||1547||1583|| 
|-
|Alonso de Guzmán El Bueno, 7th Duke of Medina Sidonia||1550||1615||later commander of the Spanish Armada
|-
|1583||Philip, Prince Asturias||1578||1621||only surviving son of Philip II, later King Philip III of Spain. Head of the order from 1598
|-
|rowspan=16|1585||Charles Emmanuel I, Duke of Savoy||1562||1630||son-in-law of Philip II
|-
|Luis Enriquez de Cabrera, 3rd Duke of Medina de Rioseco||?||1596|| 
|-
|Juan de la Cerda, 5th Duke of Medinaceli||1544||1594|| 
|-
|Rudolf II, Holy Roman Emperor||1552||1612||son of Maximilian II and nephew of Philip II
|-
|Archduke Charles of Inner Austria||1540||1590||youngest son of Ferdinand I
|-
|Archduke Ernest of Austria||1513||1595||younger brother of Rudolf II, nephew of Philip II
|-
|(William, Vilém) Guillaume Orsini de Rosenberg||1535||1592|| 
|-
|Leonhard Harrach von Rohrau und Pirckenstein||1514||1590|| 
|-
|Horace de Lannoy, 4th Prince of Sulmone||?||1597|| 
|-
|Wilhelm V, Duke of Bavaria||1548||1626|| 
|-
|Francesco de' Medici, Grand Duke of Tuscany||1541||1587|| 
|-
|Alexander Farnese, Prince of Parma||1545||1592||nephew of Philip II; from 1586, Duke of Parma
|-
|Francesco de Montefeltre, Duke of Urbino||1549||1631|| 
|-
|Vespasiano I Gonzaga Colonna, Duke of Sabbioneta||1531||1591|| 
|-
|Carlos de Aragón||c. 1520||1599|| 
|-
|Diego Fernández de Córdoba, 3rd Marquis of Camarasa||1524||1601|| 
|-
|rowspan=10|1586||Marc de Rye, Marquis de Varambon||?||1599|| 
|-
|Maximilian, Count of East Frisia||1542||1600|| 
|-
|Charles de Ligne, 2nd Prince of Arenberg||1550||1616|| 
|-
|Florent, Count of Berlaymont||?||1626|| 
|-
|Philip William d'Egmont, Prince of Gavre||1558||1590|| 
|-
|Emmanuel de Lalaing, Marquis de Renty||1547||1590|| 
|-
|Robert de Melun, Prince d'Espinoy||||1585||Died at the Siege of Antwerp before being invested.
|-
|Alfonso Felix d'Avalos d'Aragone, 6th Marquis of Pescara||1529||1593|| 
|-
|François de Vergy, Comte de Champlitte||1530||1591|| 
|-
|Francisco de Santapau Varesi, 2nd Prince of Butera||?||1590|| 
|-
|rowspan=2|1587||Onorato Caëtani, 6th Marquis of Cisterna||1541||1592|| 
|-
|||1537||1606|| 
|-
|rowspan=4|1589||Vincenzo I Gonzaga, Duke of Mantua||1562||1612|| 
|-
|Iñigo Lopez de Mendoza, 5th Duke of l'Infantado||1536||1601|| 
|-
|Juan Fernandez Pacheco, 5th Duke of Escalona||1563||1615|| 
|-
|Pietro de' Medici, Prince of Tuscany||1544||1604|| 
|-
|rowspan=4|1596||Archduke Matthias of Austria||1557||1619||later Holy Roman Emperor
|-
|Archduke Ferdinand of Austria||1578||1637||later Holy Roman Emperor Ferdinand II
|-
|Sigismund Bathory, Prince of Transylvania||1572||1613|| 
|-
|Albert VII, Archduke of Austria||1559||1621||Governor of the Spanish Netherlands
|-
|rowspan=11|1599||Louis Enriquez de Cabrera, 4th Duke of Medina de Rioseco||?||1600|| 
|-
|Ferrante II Gonzaga, Duke of Ariano||1563||1630|| 
|-
|Juan de la Cerda, 6th Duke of Medinaceli||1569||1607|| 
|-
|Antonio Alvarez de Toledo, 5th Duke of Alba||1568||1639|| 
|-
|Charles de Croy, 4th Duke of Aerschot||1560||1612|| 
|-
|Charles Philippe de Croy, Marquis d'Havré||1549||1613|| 
|-
|Philippe de Croy, Comte de Solre||1561||1612|| 
|-
|Philip William, Prince of Orange||1554||1618||Catholic son of William the Silent
|-
|Lamoral de Ligne, Prince d'Espinoy||1563||1624|| 
|-
|Charles d'Egmont, Prince de Gavre||1568||1620|| 
|-
|Claude-François de Vergy, Comte de Champlitte||?||1602|| 
|-
|rowspan=5|1600||Pietro Caëtani, 7th Duke of Sermoneta||1564||1614|| 
|-
|Sigismund III, King of Poland||1566||1632|| 
|-
|Rainuccio Farnese, Duke of Parma||1569||1622|| 
|-
|Diego Enriquez de Guzman, 5th Duke of Alba de Lista||?||1604|| 
|-
|Maximilian I, Count Palatine of Zweibrücken||1573||1651||

17th Century

!Year of Induction!!Name!!Born!!Died!!Notes
|-
|rowspan=2|1601||Hermann de Berg, Marquis of Bergen op Zoom||1558||1611|| 
|-
|Carlos Tagliava d'Aragona, 2nd Duke of Terranova||?||1605|| 
|-
|rowspan=8|1605||Ambrogio Spinola, Marquis of Sesto||1569||1630|| 
|-
|Cesare d'Este, Duke of Modena||1552||1628|| 
|-
|Alexandro Pico, 1st Duke of Mirandola||1567||1637|| 
|-
|Camillo Carraciolo, 2nd Prince of Avellino||1563||1617|| 
|-
|Matteo de Capua, 2nd Prince of Conca||?||?|| 
|-
|Marzio Colonna, Duke of Zagarolo||1584||1607|| 
|-
|Iñigo d'Avalos d'Aquino, 7th Marquis of Pescara||?||?|| 
|-
|Virginio Orsini, 2nd Duke of Bracciano||1573||1615|| 
|-
|1606||Lodovico Carafa de Marra, 4th Prince of Stigliano||1570||1630|| 
|-
|rowspan=4|1607||Andrea Matteo Acquaviva d'Aragon, 2nd Prince of Caserta||?||1635|| 
|-
|Fabrizio Branciforte, 3rd Prince of Butera||?||?|| 
|-
|Antonio de Moncada, 4th Prince of Paterno||?||1631|| 
|-
|Gian Andrea Doria, 5th Prince of Melfi||1570||1612|| 
|-
|1608||Pedro Téllez-Girón, 3rd Duke of Osuna||1574||1624|| 
|-
|rowspan=2|1609||Jean Tagliavia d'Aragon, 3rd Duke of Terranova||1585||1624|| 
|-
|Simone Galea, Notary of Malta||1570||1633||The Noble Family of Aragona in “Descrittione di Malta” 1647
|-
|rowspan=2|1610||Alonso Diego Lopez de Zuniga, 6th Duke of Béjar||1578||1619|| 
|-
|Francesco Colonna, Prince of Palestrina||?||1636|| 
|-
|1611||Rodrigo Ponce de Leon, 3rd Duke of Arcos||1545||1630|| 
|-
|rowspan=4|1612||Francisco Gonzaga, 3rd Prince of Castiglione||1577||1616|| 
|-
|Frederico Landi, 4th Prince of Val di Taro||?||1630|| 
|-
|Georg Ludwig, Landgrave of Leuchtenberg||1550||1613|| 
|-
|Paul Sixtus Trauston, Count of Falkenstein||1550||1621|| 
|-
|rowspan=5|1613||Philip, Prince of Asturias||1605||1665||later King Philip IV of Spain. Head of the order from 1621
|-
|Charles de Longueval, Comte de Bucquoy||1571||1621|| 
|-
|Frédéric de Bergen op Zoom, Baron de Boxmeer||1559||1625|| 
|-
|Charles Emmanuel de Gorrevod, Duc de Pont-de-Vaux||1569||1625|| 
|-
|Antoine de Lalaing, 4th Count of Hoogstraten||1588||1613|| 
|-
|1614||Jean de Croy, Comte de Solre||1578||1640|| 
|-
|rowspan=4|1615||Emmanuel Domingo Pérez de Guzmán, 8th Duke of Medina Sidonia||1579||1636|| 
|-
|Cleriardus de Vergy, Comte de Champlitte||1580||1630|| 
|-
|Wolfgang William, Count Palatine of Neuburg||1578||1653|| 
|-
|Wladyslaw, Crown Prince of Poland||1595||1648||later King Wladyslaw IV of Poland
|-
|1616||Carlo Philiberto d'Este, Marquis d'Este||1571||1651|| 
|-
|rowspan=5|1617||Paolo di Sangro, 2nd Prince of San Severo||1569||1624|| 
|-
|Philippe Charles, Comte d'Arenberg||1587||1640|| 
|-
|Charles Alexandre de Croÿ, Marquis d'Havré||1574||1624|| 
|-
|Christophe de Rye de la Palu||?||1663|| 
|-
|-
|Wratislaw, Count of Fürstenberg||1548||1631|| 
|-
|1618||Jean, Comte d'Ostfrise et Ritberg||1566||1625|| 
|-
|1619||Christopher of East Frisia||1569||1636|| 
|-
|rowspan=3|1620||John Ulrich, Prince of Eggenberg||1568||1634|| 
|-
|Zdenko Adalbert Poppel, Prince of Lobkowicz||1568||1628|| 
|-
|John George, Count of Hohenzollern-Sigmaringen||1577||1623|| 
|-
|rowspan=5|1621||Francisco Diego Lopez de Zuñiga, 7th Duke of Béjar||1596||1636|| 
|-
|Charles de Lalaing, 6th Count of Hoogstraeten||1569||1626|| 
|-
|François Thomas d'Oyselet Perrenot de Granvelle||?||1629|| 
|-
|Luis de Velasco, Count of Salazar||1559||1625|| 
|-
|Guillaume de Melun, Prince of Espinoy||1580||1635|| 
|-
|rowspan=2|1622||Charles I, Prince of Liechtenstein||1569||1627|| 
|-
|Leonard Helfrid, Count of Meggau||?||1644|| 
|-
|rowspan=2|1623||Infant Carlos of Spain||1607||1632||brother of King Philip IV
|-
|Francis Christoph Khevenhüller, Count of Frankenburg||1588||1650|| 
|-
|rowspan=11|1624||John III, Count of Nassau||1583||1638|| 
|-
|Archibald Campbell, 7th Earl of Argyll||1576||1638|| 
|-
|Philippe, Lord of Rubempré||?||1639|| 
|-
|Alexandre I, duc de Bournonville||1586||1656|| 
|-
|Louis d'Egmont, Prince of Gavre||1596||1654|| 
|-
|Alexandre, Prince of Arenberg and Chimay||1599||1629|| 
|-
|Paolo Savelli, 1st Prince of Albano||?||1632|| 
|-
|Honoré I, Prince of Monaco||1597||1662|| 
|-
|Fabricio Carafa, Prince of La Roccella||?||?|| 
|-
|Marino Caracciolo, 4th Prince of Avellino||1587||1630|| 
|-
|Archduke Ferdinand of Austria||1608||1657||later Emperor Ferdinand III
|-
|1626||Archduke Leopold V of Austria||1586||1632|| 
|-
|rowspan=4|1627||Alonso Fernández de Córdoba, 5th Duke of Feria||1588||1645|| 
|-
|Karl, Count Harrach von Rohrau||1570||1628|| 
|-
|Georg Ludwig, Count of Schwarzenberg||1586||1646|| 
|-
|Tiberio Vincenzo del Bosco, 3rd Prince of Cattolica||?||1654|| 
|-
|rowspan=11|1628||Albrecht von Wallenstein, Duke of Friedland||1583||1634|| 
|-
|Maximilian, Count of Sainte-Adelgonde||?||1635|| 
|-
|Jean of Montmorency, 1st Prince of Robecque||?||1631|| 
|-
|Maximilien II de Hénin, 5th Count of Bossu||?||1635|| 
|-
|Tiberio Carafa, 6th Prince of Bisignano||1580||1647|| 
|-
|Johann Jakob, Count of Bronckhorst and Anholt||1580||1630|| 
|-
|Ottavio Visconti, Count of Gamalerio||?||1632|| 
|-
|Luis Fernández de Córdoba, 7th Duke of Cardona||1608||1670|| 
|-
|Albert de Ligne, Prince of Barbançon||1600||1674|| 
|-
|Otto Heinrich Fugger, Count of Kirchberg||1592||1644|| 
|-
|Nicholas, Count Esterházy de Galántha||1582||1645|| 
|-
|1629||Ramboldo, Count of Collalto||1575||1630|| 
|-
|1630||Philippe Lamoral de Gand, Count of Isenghien||1587||1631|| 
|-
|rowspan=3|1631||Filippo Spinola, 2nd Marquis of Los Balbases||1596||1659|| 
|-
|Gottfried Heinrich Graf zu Pappenheim||1594||1632|| 
|-
|Adam von Waldstein||1570||1638|| 
|-
|1633||Gianbattista de Capua, Prince of Caspoli||?||1634|| 
|-
|rowspan=5|1634||Etoro Ravaschiero, Prince of Satriano||?||?|| 
|-
|Paolo de Sangro, 4th Prince of San Severo||1605||1636|| 
|-
|Ercole Teodoro Trivulzio, 2nd Prince Mussocco||1620||1664|| 
|-
|Maximilian, Prince of Dietrichstein||1596||1655|| 
|-
|Maximilian, Count of Trauttmansdorff-Weinsberg||1584||1650|| 
|-
|1635||Archduke Ferdinand Karl of Austria||1628||1662|| 
|-
|rowspan=4|1638||Claude de Lannoy, 1st Count of la Motterie||1578||1643|| 
|-
|Balthasar Carlos, Prince of Asturias||1629||1646||son of King Philip IV
|-
|Francesco I d'Este, Duke of Modena||1610||1658||Brother-in-law of Maffeo Barberini (through his final marriage to Lucrezia Barberini); also a Knight of the Golden Fleece.
|-
|John II Casimir of Poland||1609||1672|| 
|-
|rowspan=4|1639||Siegfried Christoph von Breuner||?||1651|| 
|-
|Rudolf von Tiefenbach||1582||1653|| 
|-
|William, Margrave of Baden-Baden||1593||1677|| 
|-
|Francesco Maria Carafa, 5th Duke of Nocera||?||1642||Viceroy of Aragon and of Navarre
|-
|1642||Carlo de Tocco, Duke of Leucada||?||1674|| 
|-
|rowspan=7|1644||Ottavio Piccolomini, 1st Duke of Amalfi||1599||1655|| 
|-
|Philippe Balthazar de Gand||1617||1680|| 
|-
|Wilhelm, Count of Slawata||1572||1652|| 
|-
|Wenzel Poppel, Prince Lobkowicz||1609||1677|| 
|-
|Anton Ulrich, Prince of Eggenberg||1610||1649|| 
|-
|Heinrich Schlick, Count of Passau||?||1650|| 
|-
|Francesco del Carretto, 2nd Marquis of Grana||?||1651|| 
|-
|1645||Sigismund Ludwig, Count of Dietrichstein||?||1678|| 
|-
|rowspan=6|1646||Philippe François, 1st Duke of Arenberg||1625||1674|| 
|-
|Eugène de Hénin, 6th Count of Bossu||?||1656|| 
|-
|Philippe François de Croy, Duke of Havré||1609||1650|| 
|-
|Claude Lamoral, Prince of Ligne||1610||1679|| 
|-
|Philippe d'Arenberg, Prince of Chimay||1619||1675|| 
|-
|Eustache de Croy, Count of Roeulx||1609||1653|| 
|-
|rowspan=2|1647||George Adam Borzitza, Count of Martinitz||1602||1651|| 
|-
|John Louis, Prince of Nassau-Hadamar||1590||1653|| 
|-
|rowspan=3|1648||Juan Francisco Pimentel, 7th Duke of Benavente||1594||1652|| 
|-
|Nicolo Maria de Guzman, 7th Prince of Stigliano||?||1689|| 
|-
|Heinrich Wilhelm von Starhemberg||1593||1675|| 
|-
|rowspan=1|1649||Diego Fernandez Pacheco Portocarrero, 7th Duke of Escalona||1599||1653|| 
|-
|rowspan=6|1650||Ferdinand IV, King of Hungary and Bohemia||1634||1654||son of Emperor Ferdinand III
|-
|Paul von Palffy d'Erdödod, Palatine of Hungary||1589||1653|| 
|-
|Johann Weikhard, Prince of Auersperg||1615||1677|| 
|-
|Sigismondo Sfrodati, Marquis of Montafia||?||1652|| 
|-
|Charles Albert de Longueval, Count of Bucquoy||1607||1663|| 
|-
|Johann Adolf, Count of Schwarzenberg||1615||1685|| 
|-
|rowspan=4|1651||Luis de Moncada, 7th Duke of Montalto||1614||1672|| 
|-
|Luis Ramon de Aragón, Duke of Cardona||1608||1670|| 
|-
|Diego d'Aragon, 4th Duke of Terranova||1596||1663|| 
|-
|Ferdinand del Carreto, Marquis of Grana||?||1651|| 
|-
|rowspan=5|1653||Philip William, Count Palatine of Neuburg||1615||1690|| 
|-
|Georg Achaz, Count of Losenstein||1597||1653|| 
|-
|Johann Franz Trautson, Count of Falkenstein||1609||1663|| 
|-
|Marcantonio V Colonna, 5th Prince of Paliano||1606/10||1659||Father of Lorenzo Onofrio Colonna and uncle of Maffeo Barberini; also Knights of the Golden Fleece.
|-
|Francesco Filomarino, Prince of Rocca d'Aspro||1606||1659|| 
|-
|rowspan=2|1654||Archduke Leopold of Austria||1640||1705||later Emperor Leopold I. 1st head of the Austrian Branch of the Order from the King Charles II of Spain's death (1700) as heir of Philip the Good (House of Habsburg's Chief)
|-
|Luis Ignacio Fernández de Córdoba, 6th Duke of Feria||1623||1665|| 
|-
|rowspan=2|1655||Maximilian Adam von Waldstein||?||1654|| 
|-
|Johann Maximilian von Lamberg||1608||1682|| 
|-
|1656||Alonso Lopez de Zuniga, 8th Duke of Béjar||1621||1660|| 
|-
|rowspan=7|1657||John Ferdinand, Count of Porcia||1605||1665|| 
|-
|Bernard Borzita, Count of Martinitz, Palatine of Hungary||1603||1665|| 
|-
|Annibal Gonzague, Prince of San Martino||1602||1668|| 
|-
|Jean Christophe, Count of Pueccheim||?||1657|| 
|-
|Charles d'Este, Marquis of Borgomanero||1622||1659|| 
|-
|Niccolò Ludovisi, Prince of Piombino||1610||1664|| 
|-
|Philippe Emmanuel of Croy, Count of Solre||1611||1670|| 
|-
|1658||Bernardino Savelli, 2nd Prince of Albano||1606||1658|| 
|-
|rowspan=3|1659||Jules Savelli, 3rd Prince of Albano||1626||1712|| 
|-
|Bernard Fabricio Pignatelli, 5th Duke of Monteleone||1606||1664|| 
|-
|Francesco IV Caetani, 9th Duke of Sermoneta||1594||1683|| 
|-
|rowspan=2|1661||John Francis, Prince of Nassau||1627||1699|| 
|-
|Ferdinand Bonaventura, Count of Harrach||1636||1706|| 
|-
|rowspan=3|1662||Giovanni Battista Borghese, 2nd Prince of Sulmona||1639||1717|| 
|-
|Francis, Count Wesselenyi of Hadad||1605||1667|| 
|-
|Raimundo de Lencastre Manrique de Cardenas, 4th Duke of Aveiro||1620||1666|| 
|-
|rowspan=6|1663||John, Count of Rottal||?||1674|| 
|-
|George Louis, Count of Sinzendorf||1616||1681|| 
|-
|Francesco Marino Caracciolo, 5th Prince of Avellino||1631||1674|| 
|-
|Sigismund, Archduke of Austria, Count of Tyrol||1630||1665|| 
|-
|Francis Eusebius, Count of Pötting||?||1678|| 
|-
|Philip II Caetani, 4th Prince of Caserta||1626||1687|| 
|-
|rowspan=3|1664||Nicolas, Count of Zrin||1620||1664|| 
|-
|Carl I. Ferdinand Montenari, Count of Montenari||1632||1689|| 
|-
|Antonio Teodoro Trivulzio, 3rd Prince of Musocco||?||1678|| 
|-
|rowspan=2|1665||Walther, Count of Leslie||1606||1667|| 
|-
|Charles II, King of Spain||1661||1700||Head of the Order from 1665 to 1700
|-
|1667||Francis Albert, Count of Harrach||1614||1666|| 
|-
|rowspan=8|1668||Manuel Diego Lopez de Zuniga, 10th Duke of Béjar||1657||1686|| 
|-
|Philippe Spinola, Comte de Bruay||1612||1670|| 
|-
|Ferdinand Joseph, Prince of Dietrichstein||1636||1698|| 
|-
|Raimondo Montecuccoli||1609||1680|| 
|-
|Albert Francis de Croy, Count of Meghem||1615||1674|| 
|-
|Lorenzo Onofrio Colonna 6th Duke of Paliano||1637||1689||Son of Marcantonio V Colonna and cousin of Maffeo Barberini; both also Knights of the Golden Fleece.
|-
|Marzio Carafa, 7th Duke of Maddaloni||?||?|| 
|-
|Maffeo Barberini, Prince of Palestrina||1631||1685||Brother-in-law (by the marriage of his sister, Lucrezia Barberini) of Francesco I d'Este, Duke of Modena, also a Knight of the Golden Fleece.
|-
|rowspan=4|1669||Balthasar Sarmiento de Mendoza, 5th Marquis of Camarasa||?||1715|| 
|-
|Michał Korybut Wiśniowiecki, King of Poland||1640||1673|| 
|-
|Giovanni Battista Ludovisio, Prince of Piombino||1638||1699|| 
|-
|Teobaldo, Marquis of Visconti, Count of Gallarate||?||1674|| 
|-
| rowspan=7|1670||Charles Louis de Bauffremont, Marquis of Messimieux||?||1682|| 
|-
|Juan Francisco de la Cerda, 8th Duke of Medinaceli||1637||1691|| 
|-
|Pedro Nuño Colón de Portugal, 6th Duke of Veragua||1628||1673|| 
|-
|Ettore Pignatelli d'Aragon, 6th Duke of Monteleone||1620||1674|| 
|-
|Philip II, Count of Egmont and Prince of Gavre||1623||1682|| 
|-
|Ferdinand Francis de Croy, Duke of Havré||1644||1694|| 
|-
|Charles, Baron of Watteville and Marquis of Conflans||1638||1670|| 
|-
| rowspan=2|1671||David Ungnad, Count of Weissenwolff||1604||1672|| 
|-
|Julius Cesar Colonna, Prince of Carbognano||?||1681|| 
|-
|rowspan=3|1672||John Hartwig, Count of Nostitz||1610||1683|| 
|-
|||1623||1690|| 
|-
|Fernando Francisco de Avalos y Aquino, 10th Marquis of Pescara||?||1672|| 
|-
|rowspan=1|1673||Juan de Velasco y Henin, 5th Count of Salazar||1609||1678|| 
|-
|rowspan=2|1674||Alexander II, Duke of Bournonville and Count of Hennin||1616||1690|| 
|-
|Albert, Count of Zinzendorff and Pottendorff||1618||1683|| 
|-
|rowspan=13|1675||Charles Henri de Lorraine, Prince of Vaudémont||1642||1723|| 
|-
|Carlantonio Spinelli, 5th Prince of Cariati||1645||1725|| 
|-
|John Hubert, Count Czernin of Chudenicz||1628||1682|| 
|-
|Leopold William, Count of Königsegg and Rothenfels||1630||1694|| 
|-
|Charles Ferdinand, Count of Waldstein||1634||1702|| 
|-
|Alexander Farnese, Prince of Parma||1635||1689||Governor of the Habsburg Netherlands (1678–1682).
|-
|Ernest Alexander of Arenberg, Prince of Chimay||1643||1686|| 
|-
|Antonio Álvarez de Toledo y Pimentel, 7th Duke of Alba||1615||1690|| 
|-
|Pedro II Manuel Colón y Portugal, 7th Duke of Veragua||1651||1710|| 
|-
|André Fabrizio Pignatelli d'Aragona, 7th Duke of Monteleone||1640||1677|| 
|-
|Antooine, Count of Trotti Bentivoglio||1627||1681|| 
|-
|Eugène of Montmorency, 2nd Prince of Robecque||1615||1683|| 
|-
|Jean Charles de Watteville, Marquis of Conflans||1628||1699|| 
|-
|rowspan=6|1678||Othon Henri del Caretto, Marquis of Savona||1639||1685|| 
|-
|Charles V, Duke of Lorraine||1643||1690|| 
|-
|Charles, Count of Borromeo Arona||1657||1734|| 
|-
|Cesar, Marquis of Visconti||1643||1716|| 
|-
|Carlos de Aragón de Gurrea, 9th duke of Villahermosa||1634||1692|| 
|-
|Charles Eugene, 2nd Duke of Arenberg||1633||1681|| 
|-
|1680||Antonio Alvarez de Toledo, 8th Duke of Alba||1627||1701|| 
|-
|rowspan=6|1681||Conrad Balthazar, Count of Starhemberg||1648||1730|| 
|-
| ||1635||1698|| 
|-
|Giuseppe Branciforte, Prince of Pietraperia||?||1698|| 
|-
|Francis Maximilian, Count of Mansfeld||1639||1692|| 
|-
|Dominico Marzio Carafa, 8th Duke of Maddaloni||?||?|| 
|-
|Paul I, 1st Prince Esterházy of Galántha||1635||1713|| 
|-
|rowspan=4|1682||Octavius Ignatius, Prince of Arenberg and Barbançon||1643||1693|| 
|-
|John Ernest, Duke of Schleswig-Holstein||1637||1700|| 
|-
|Jakub Ludwik Sobieski||1667||1737||Crown Prince of Poland
|-
|Ernest Rudiger, Count of Starhemberg||1638||1701|| 
|-
|1683||Henri Francis Philip of Melun, Marquis of Richebourg||1627||1690|| 
|-
|rowspan=3|1684||Francis Marie Carafa, 3rd Prince of Belvedere||?||1711|| 
|-
|Henri Louis Ernest, Prince of Ligne||1644||1702|| 
|-
|Francis Augustine, Count of Waldstein||1657||1734|| 
|-
|rowspan=2|1685||Philippe Charles d'Arenberg, 3rd Duke of Arenberg||1663||1691|| 
|-
|Henri Francis, Count of Mannsfeld and Prince of Fondi||1646||1715|| 
|-
|rowspan=2|1686||John Francis, Count palatine, Duke of Bavaria||1658||1716|| 
|-
|Juan Manuel Diego López de Zuniga, 11th Duke of Béjar||1680||1647|| 
|-
|rowspan=17|1687||Archduke Joseph of Austria||1678||1711||later Emperor Joseph I. Head of the Austrian order from 1705
|-
|Eugene, Prince of Savoy||1663||1736|| 
|-
||Louis Ernest, Count of Egmont and Prince of Gavre||1665||1693|| 
|-
|Iñigo Manuel Vélez de Guevara, 10th Count of Oñate||1642||1699|| 
|-
|Juan Manuel López de Pacheco, 8th Duke of Escalona||1648||1725|| 
|-
|Helmhard Christopher Ungnad, Count of Weissenwolff||1635||1702|| 
|-
|Adolf Wratislas, Count of Sternberg||?||1703|| 
|-
|Wolfgang Andreas Orsini, Count of Rosenberg||1626||1695|| 
|-
|Amadeus, Count of Windisch-Graetz||1630||1695|| 
|-
|Dominikus Andreas, Count of Kaunitz||1655||1705|| 
|-
|Philip of Hennin, Count of Boussu and Prince of Chimay||1646||1688|| 
|-
|Eugen Alexander Franz, 1st Prince of Thurn and Taxis||1677||1714|| 
|-
|Jaime de Silva Fernández, Duke of Hijar||c. 1623||1700|| 
|-
|Eugene de Berghes, Prince of Rache||1624||1688|| 
|-
|Urbano Barberini, 3rd Prince of Palestrina||1666||1722||Son of Maffeo Barberini, also Knight of the Golden Fleece.
|-
|Ferdinand Gaston Lamoral de Croy, Count of Roeulx||1660||1720|| 
|-
|Luis Fernández de Córdoba, 7th Duke of Feria||1650||1690|| 
|-
|rowspan=5|1688||Francis Charles Liebsteinsky, Count of Kolowrat||1620||1700|| 
|-
|Francis, Count of Kinsky of Wchinitz and Tettau||1632||1699|| 
|-
|John Quentin, Count of Jörger||1624||1705|| 
|-
|Ferdinand, Prince of Schwarzenberg||1652||1703|| 
|-
|Antoine Carafa, Count of Forli||1642||1693|| 
|-
|1689||Filippo II Colonna||1663||1714||Prince of Paliano and High Constable of Naples from 1689. Son of Lorenzo Onofrio Colonna; also a Knight of the Golden Fleece.
|-
|rowspan=2|1690||Leopold Joseph, Duke of Lorraine and Bar||1679||1729|| 
|-
|Manuel Fernández de Córdoba, 8th Duke of Feria||1679||1700|| 
|-
|1691||Louis William, Margrave of Baden||1655||1707|| 
|-
|rowspan=2|1692||Maximilian II Emanuel, Elector of Bavaria||1666||1726|| 
|-
|Fernando de Castro Portugal, 11th Count of Lemos||1666||1741|| 
|-
|1693||Gregorio de Silva y Mendoza, 9th Duke of Infantado||1640||1693|| 
|-
|rowspan=14|1694||Charles-Louis de Hennin de Boussu, Prince de Chimay||1674||1740|| 
|-
|Balthazar Naselli del Carillo, Prince of Aragona||?||1720|| 
|-
|Giuseppe Mattei Orsini, 3rd Duke of Paganica||1673||1740|| 
|-
|Philippe François de Berghes, 1st Prince of Grimberghen||1646||1704|| 
|-
|Francesco Caracciolo, 5th Prince of Avellino||1668||1720|| 
|-
|Jean Philippe, Count of Mérode and Marquis de Westerloo||1674||1732|| 
|-
|Christopher Leopold, Count of Schaffgotsch||1623||1703|| 
|-
|Francis Joseph, Count (later Prince) of Lamberg||1637||1712|| 
|-
|Hans Adam I, Prince of Liechtenstein||1656||1712|| 
|-
|Jean Chrétien, Duke of Cromau and Prince of Eggenberg||1641||1710|| 
|-
|Otto Honorius, Count of Abensperg-Traun||1644||1715|| 
|-
|Philip Sigismund, Count of Dietrichstein||1651||1716|| 
|-
|Enea, Count of Caprara||1631||1701|| 
|-
|Charles III Philip of Bavaria, Elector Palatine of Rhin||1661||1742|| 
|-
|rowspan=5|1695||Antonio Francesco, Count of Collalto||1630||1696|| 
|-
|Ferdinand Wenceslas Poppel, Count of Lobkowicz||?||1697|| 
|-
|Cesar, Marquis of Vidoni||?||1772|| 
|-
|Ferdinand Marquard, Count of Wartenberg||1673||1730|| 
|-
|Íñigo de la Cruz Manrique de Lara, 11th Count of Aguilar||1673||1733|| 
|-
|rowspan=12|1697||Aloys Thomas, Count of Harrach||1669||1742|| Viceroy of Naples
|-
|Charles Carafa, 4th Prince of Belvedere||?||?|| 
|-
||Archduke Charles of Austria||1685||1740|| later Emperor Charles VI. Head of the Austrian order from 1711
|-
|George Louis, Landgrave of Hesse-Darmstadt||1669||1705|| 
|-
|John Siegfried, Duke of Cromau and Prince of Eggenberg||1644||1713|| 
|-
|Anton Florian, Prince of Liechtenstein||1656||1721|| 
|-
|Leopold Ignacius, Prince of Montecuccoli||1662||1698|| 
|-
|John Francis, Count of Wrbna and Freudenthal||1634||1705|| 
|-
|Siegfried Christopher, Count of Breuner||?||1698|| 
|-
|Maximilian, Count of Thun||1638||1701|| 
|-
|George Adam, Count of Martinitz-Borzita||?||1714|| 
|-
|Augustus II, King of Poland||1670||1733|| 
|-
|rowspan=6|1698||Ferdinand Augustus Poppel, Prince of Lobkowicz||1655||1715|| 
|-
|Octavius, Marquis of Cavriani||?||?|| 
|-
|Nicolas Placido Branciforte, Prince of Pietrapercia||?||?|| 
|-
|John Leopold, Prince of Trautson and Count of Falkenstein||1659||1724|| 
|-
|Charles Ernest, Count of Waldstein||1661||1713|| 
|-
|Leopold Ignaz Joseph, Prince of Dietrichstein||1660||1708|| 
|-
|rowspan=3|1699||Francis Taffe, Count of Carlingfort||1639||1704|| 
|-
|Côme Claude d'Ognies, Count of Coupigny||1646||1709|| 
|-
|Wenceslaus Albert, Count of Sternberg||?||1708|| 
|-
|rowspan=12|1700||Cesar of Avalos and Aquino, 12th Marquis of Pescara||1667||1729|| 
|-
|Guillaume de Melun, Marquis of Richebourg||1670||1734|| 
|-
|Philippe Antoine, Prince of Rubempré||1650||1707|| 
|-
|Charles Emmanuel of Watteville, Marquis of Conflans||1656||1728|| 
|-
|Domenico d'Acquaviva et d'Aragon, comte de Conversano|| ?|| ?|| 
|-
|Leopold Philip, 4th Duke of Arenberg||1690||1754|| 
|-
|Ferdinand Gravina and Cruyllas, 4th Prince of Palagoinia||?||1736|| 
|-
|Ernest Frederic, Count of Windisch-Graetz||1670||1727|| 
|-
|Leopold Joseph, Count of Lamberg||1653||1706|| 
|-
|Joseph Matthias, Count of Lamberg||1667||1711|| 
|-
|Charles, Count of Archinto||1670||1732|| 
|-
|Charles Thomas de Lorraine, Prince of Commercy and Vaudémont||1670||1704|| 
|-

Knights of the Spanish Golden Fleece

18th Century

!Year of Induction!!Name!!Born!!Died!!Notes
|-
|rowspan=6|1701||Philip V, King of Spain||1682||1746||Grandnephew of King Charles II of Spain. 1st head of the Spanish Branch of the Order from the King's death as his successor.
|-
|Charles, Duke of Berry||1686||1714|| 
|-
|Philip I, Duke of Orléans||1640||1701|| 
|-
|Paul de Beauvilliers, 2nd duc de Saint-Aignan||1648||1714|| 
|-
|Philippe II, Duke of Orléans||1674||1723||Regent of France
|-
|Charles Albert of Bavaria||1697||1745||later Elector of Bavaria and Emperor Charles VII
|-
|rowspan=6|1702||Adrien Maurice,Duke of Noailles||1678||1766|| 
|-
|Albert Alfred, Count then Prince of Serclaes-Tilly||1646||1715|| 
|-
|||1658||1731|| 
|-
|||1663||1709|| 
|-
|Louis François d'Harcourt, Count of Beuvron||1677||1714|| 
|-
|Louis Joseph de Bourbon, Duke of Vendôme||1654||1712|| 
|-
|rowspan=2|1703||Jean François de Bette, Marquis of Lede||1667||1725|| 
|-
|Louis François, Duke of Boufflers||1644||1711|| 
|-
|rowspan=2|1704||Louis Alexandre de Bourbon, Count of Toulouse||1678||1737|| 
|-
|James FitzJames, 1st Duke of Berwick and Liria||1670||1734|| 
|-
|rowspan=2|1705||Jean Frédéric, Count of Autel||1645||1716|| 
|-
|Antoine Charles, Duke of Gramont||1641||1720|| 
|-
|rowspan=4|1706||Procope François, Count of Egmont and Prince of Gavre||1664||1707|| 
|-
|Maximilian Gaëtan, Count of Toerring Seefeld||1670||1752|| 
|-
|Alphonse Dominique François, Prince de Berghes||?||1720|| son of Philippe François, Prince de Berghes
|-
|Victor Marie, Duke of Estrées||1660||1737|| 
|-
|rowspan=4|1707||||1683||1710|| 
|-
|Francisco Fernández de la Cueva, 10th Duke of Alburquerque||1666||1733|| 
|-
|Francisco Pío de Saboya, 6th Marquis of Castel Rodrigo||1672||1723|| 
|-
|Alexandre Maître, Marquis de Bay||1650||1715|| 
|-
|1708||Francis II Rákóczi, Prince of Transylvania||1676||1735|| 
|-
|rowspan=5|1709||Victor Amadeus Ferrero Fieschi, Prince of Masserano||1687||1743|| 
|-
|Marcello de Ceva Grimaldi||1652||1725|| 
|-
|Jacques Antoine de Bauffremont||c. 1682||1710|| 
|-
|Michel Joseph, duc de Bournonville Michel Joseph, Duke of Bournonville||1672||1752|| 
|-
|Giosia Acquaviva d'Aragona, 16th Duke of Atri||1680||1710|| 
|-
|rowspan=2|1710||Jacques Bazin, Count of Bezons||1645||1733|| 
|-
|Domenico Acquaviva d'Aragona, 17th Duke of Atri||1689||1745|| 
|-
|rowspan=3|1711||||1680||1745|| 
|-
|Louis Bénigne, Marquis of Bauffremont and Prince de Listenois||1684||1755|| 
|-
|Jean Louis, Marquis of Arpajon||1669||1750|| 
|-
|rowspan=2|1712||Jean Baptiste Ducasse||1646||1715|| 
|-
|Procope Charles Nicolas Augustin Pignatelli, Count of Egmont and Prince of Gavre||1703||1743|| 
|-
|rowspan=3|1713||Louis, Marquis of Brancas and Prince of Nisaro||1672||1750|| 
|-
|Louis Hector, Marquis later Duke of Villars||1653||1734|| 
|-
|||1692||1763|| 
|-
|rowspan=3|1714||Restaino Cantelmo Stuart, 8th Duke of Popoli and Prince of Pettorano||1655||1723|| 
|-
|James Francis Fitz-James Stuart, 2nd Duke of Berwick, Liria and Jérica||1696||1738||son of James FitzJames, 1st Duke of Berwick
|-
|Louis Pierre Maximilien de Béthune, duc de Sully||1685||1761|| 
|-
|rowspan=3|1715||Francis Immanuel Ignatius, Prince of Nassau-Siegen||1678||1735|| 
|-
|Louis Henri d'Harcourt, Count (later Marquis) of Beuvron||1692||1716||son of Henry d'Harcourt
|-
|Claude Francis Bidal, Marquis of Asfeld||1667||1743|| 
|-
|1716||Claude Abraham de Tubières de Grimoard de Pestel de Lévis, Duke of Caylus||c. 1672||1759|| 
|-
|rowspan=4|1717||Louis, Prince of Asturias||1707||1724||later King Louis of Spain. Head of the order in 1724
|-
|Lelio Carafa, Marquis of Arienzo||?||1762|| 
|-
|Charles Grillo||?||1724|| 
|-
|Stefano Mari Centurioni, Marquis of Mari||?||1749|| 
|-
|1721||Jean Baptiste Louis Andrault, Marquis of Maulévrier Langeron||1677||1754|| 
|-
|rowspan=2|1722||Louis de Rouvroy, Duke of Saint-Simon||1675||1755|| 
|-
|Philippe Charles, Marquis of La Fare||1685||1782|| 
|-
|rowspan=3|1723||Infante Ferdinand of Spain||1713||1759||later King Ferdinand VI of Spain. Head of the order from 1746
|-
|Infante Charles of Spain||1716||1788||later Duke Charles I of Parma, King Charles VII of the Two Sicilies and III of Spain. Head of the order from 1759
|-
|Infante Philip of Spain||1720||1765||later Duke Philip of Parma
|-
|rowspan=13|1724||Nicolás Fernández de Córdoba, 10th Duke of Medinaceli and Feria||1682||1739|| 
|-
|Hyacinthe Boutin, Marquis of Valouse||1671||1736|| 
|-
|||1688||1747|| 
|-
|Mercurio Antonio López Pacheco, 9th Marquis of Villena, 9th Duke of Escalona and Count of Santisteban de Gorma||1679||1738|| 
|-
|Domingo María Carlos de Guzman el Bueno, 13th Duke of Medinasidonia||1691||1739|| 
|-
|Antonio Arduino||?||1731|| 
|-
|Alfonso Fernández Manrique de Lara, 1st Duke of Arco||1672||1737|| 
|-
|José Grimaldi, Marquis of Grimaldi||1660||1733|| 
|-
|Álvaro Benavides Bazán, 7th Marquis of Santa Cruz||?||1737|| 
|-
|Annibal, Marquis of Scotti||?||1752|| 
|-
|Jacques Antoine de Bauffremont||c. 1682||1710|| 
|-
|Louis d'Orléans, Duke of Orléans||1703||1752|| 
|-
|Louis Henri, Duke of Bourbon, Enghien and Prince of Condé||1692||1740|| 
|-
|1725||René de Froulay Count de Tessé||1650||1725|| 
|-
|1727||Francesco de Evoli, Duke of Castropignano||?||1758|| 
|-
|1728||Rodrigo Ignacio de Saa Almeida y Meneses, 7th Count of Penaguiaon||1676||1733|| 
|-
|rowspan=2|1732||José Carrillo de Albornoz, Count (later Duke) of Montemar||1671||1747|| 
|-
|José Patiño||1666||1736|| 
|-
|1734||Marie François Henri de Franquetot, Count of Coigny||1670||1759|| 
|-
|1735||Infante Louis Antonio of Spain||1727||1785||Cardinal Archbishop of Toledo and Seville, later Count of Chinchón
|-
|rowspan=2|1736||||1706||1777|| 
|-
|Honoré Armand, Duke of Villars and Prince of Martigues||1702||1770|| 
|-
|rowspan=3|1737|||||1696||1757|| 
|-
|Michele Reggio Branciforte||1682||1772|| 
|-
|José Armendáriz, 1st Marquis of Castelfuerte||1665||1749|| 
|-
|rowspan=7|1738||Pedro Cebrián, Count of Fuenclara||1687||1752|| 
|-
|Jaime Miguel de Guzmán de Avalos y Spinola, Marquis of la Mina, Duke of Palata and Prince of Masa||1691||1767|| 
|-
|||1705||1744|| 
|-
|Nicola Sangro||1678||1750|| 
|-
|Louis Jean Marie, Duke of Penthièvre||1725||1793|| 
|-
|Andrés López Pacheco, 10th Marquis of Villena and 10th Duke of Escalona||1710||1746|| 
|-
|Albert, Duke of Saxe-Teschen||1738||1822|| 
|-
|rowspan=4|1739||Louis XV, King of France||1710||1774|| 
|-
|Louis, Dauphin of France||1729||1765|| 
|-
|Louis Pierre Engelbert, Count of la Marck||1674||1750|| 
|-
|Marino Francesco Carriciolo, 7th Prince of Avellino||1714||1773|| 
|-
|1740||||1692||1754|| 
|-
|rowspan=2|1742||Maximilian III, Duke and Elector of Bavaria||1727||1747|| 
|-
|Charles Louis César Auguste Fouquet, Duke of Belle-Isle||1684||1761|| 
|-
|1743||Melchor de Solis y Gante, Duke of Astrito and Marquis of Valladares||?||1752|| 
|-
|rowspan=3|1745||Jean Bonaventure Dumont, Count of Gages||1682||1753|| 
|-
|Domenico Marzio Carafa, 9th Duke of Maddaloni and Prince of la Guardia||1672||1750|| 
|-
|Louis de Brancas, Duke of Lauraguais||1714||1793|| 
|-
|rowspan=4|1746||Fernando de Silva Mendoza y Toledo, 12th Duke of Alba||1714||1776|| 
|-
|Philippe de Noailles, Duke of Mouchy and Prince of Poix||1715||1794|| 
|-
|Sebastián Antonio de Guzmán y Spinola Enríquez Colonna, 5th Marquis of Montealegre||1683||1757|| 
|-
|||1692||1757|| 
|-
|1747||Infante Felipe, Duke of Calabria||1747||1777||son of King Charles VII of the Two Sicilies (later Charles III of Spain) excluded from succession to the throne due to his imbecility.
|-
|1748||||1704||1768|| 
|-
|rowspan=2|1749||Infante Charles of Spain||1748||1819||later King Charles IV of Spain. Head of the Order from 1788 to 1808
|-
|Clement, Duke of Bavaria and Count Palatine||1722||1770|| 
|-
|rowspan=5|1750||Luca Spinola y Spinola, Count of Siruela||1680||1750|| 
|-
|Zenón de Somodevilla y Bengoechea, Marquis of Ensenada||1702||1781|| 
|-
|, 9th Marquis of Villafranca del Bierzo, Duke of Fernandina and Montalto, Prince of Paternò||1686||1753|| 
|-
|José de Carvajal y Lancaster||1698||1754|| 
|-
|Joaquín Diego López de Zuñiga, 12th Duke of Béjar and Marquis of Gibraleón||1715||1777|| 
|-
|rowspan=2|1751||Ferdinand, Prince of Parma||1751||1802||later Duke of Parma
|-
|Infante Ferdinand of Spain||1751||1725||later King Ferdinand I of the Two Sicilies (IV of Naples and III of Sicily)
|-
|rowspan=5|1752||Infante Gabriel of Spain||1752||1788||son of King Charles VII of the Two Sicilies (later Charles III of Spain)
|-
|Louis Philippe, Duke of Chartres||1725||1785||later Duke Louis Philippe I of Orléans
|-
|Victor Philip Ferrero Fieschi, Prince of Masserano||1713||1777|| 
|-
|||1684||1758|| 
|-
|Domingo Cattaneo della Volta, Prince of San Nicandro and Duke of Termoli||1697||1782|| 
|-
|rowspan=3|1753||François Jose de Bournonville, Duke of Bournonville||1710||1769|| 
|-
|||1716||1773|| 
|-
|Pedro de Alcántara Alonso Pérez de Guzmán el Bueno, 14th Duke of Medinasidonia and 17th Count of Niebla||1724||1777|| 
|-
|1754||Louis, Duke of Burgundy ||1751||1761||son of Louis, Dauphin of France
|-
|1755||Lorenzo Colonna, 9th Prince of Paliano and Tagliacozzo, Prince of Castiglione||1723||1779|| 
|-
|rowspan=2|1756||Infante Anthony of Spain||1755||1817||son of King Charles VII of the Two Sicilies (later Charles III of Spain)
|-
|Pedro Pablo Abarca de Bolea, 10th Count of Aranda||1718||1798|| 
|-
|1757||Infante Francisco of Spain||1757||1771||son of King Charles III of Spain;
|-
|1758||José Maria de Guzmán Guevara, 6th Marquis of Montealegre and 13th Count of Oñate||?||1781|| 
|-
|rowspan=4|1761||Louis, Duke of Berry||1754||1793||later King Louis XVI of France
|-
|Charles Philip, Count of Artois||1757||1836||later King Charles X of France
|-
|||1724||1776|| 
|-
|Etienne François, Duke of Choiseul||1719||1785|| 
|-
|1762||Nicolás de Carvajal y Lancáster, Marquis of Sarria||?||1770|| 
|-
|rowspan=4|1764||||1706||1783|| 
|-
|Luis Manuel Laso de la Vega, Marquis of Miranda and Duke of Arco||?||1768|| 
|-
|Antonio de Venavides y de la Cueva, Duke of Santisteban||1726||1782|| 
|-
|||1726||1780|| 
|-
|rowspan=2|1765||Paolo Jeronimo Grimaldi Pallavicini, Duke of Grimaldi||1710||1789|| 
|-
|John Clement, Count of Branicki||1689||1771|| 
|-
|rowspan=4|1767||Casimir Pignatelli, Count of Egmont and Prince of Gavre||1727||1801|| 
|-
|Jean Juste Ferdinand, Prince of Croy-Havré and Count of Priego||1716||1790|| 
|-
|Jose Bonano Filangieri del Bosco, Prince of Rocafiorita and Cattolica||?||?|| 
|-
|Louis, Count of Provence||1755||1824||later King Louis XVIII of France
|-
|1768||Joaquín Manrique de Zuñiga, Count of Baños and Marquis of Leyva||?||1783|| 
|-
|1770||Michele Imperiali Simeana, Prince of Francavilla||1719||1782|| 
|-
|rowspan=3|1771||Infante Charles Clement of Spain||1771||1774||son of Charles, Prince of Asturias (Charles IV of Spain)
|-
|Alonso Vicente de Solís Folch de Cardona, Duke of Montellano||?||1780|| 
|-
|||1734||1802|| 
|-
|rowspan=5|1772||||1730||1789|| 
|-
|Ventura Osorio de Moscoso y Guzmán, 14th Marquis of Astorga and Duke of Sesa||1732||1776|| 
|-
|Andrés Téllez Girón, Duke of Uceda||1728||1780|| 
|-
|Emmanuel Félicité, Count of Durfort and Duke of Duras||1715||1789|| 
|-
|Joaquín Antonio de Palafox y Rebolledo, Marquis of Ariza||?||1775|| 
|-
|1773||Louis, Prince of Parma, ||1773||1803||later King of Etruria
|-
|1775||Prince Carlo Tito of Naples||1775||1778||son of King Ferdinand I of the Two Sicilies
|-
|1777||Prince Francis of Naples||1777||1830||later King Francis I of the Two-Sicilies
|-
|rowspan=9|1779||Infante Carlos Eusebio of Spain||1779||1783||son of Charles, Prince of Asturias (Charles IV of Spain)
|-
|Bartolomeo de Capua, 20th Count of Altavilla, Duke of Airola, Prince of Riccia||?||?|| 
|-
|Pedro Téllez Girón, 8th Duke of Osuna||1728||1787|| 
|-
|Pascual Benito Belvis de Moncada, 3rd Marquis of Belgida and San Juan de Piedras Albos||1727||1781|| 
|-
|Vicente Manrique de Zúñiga, Marquis of Aguilafuente and Count of Aguilar||?||?|| 
|-
|Pedro de Alcántara Fadrique Fernández de Híjar, 10th Duke of Híjar||?||1794|| 
|-
|||1738||1805|| 
|-
|Fausto Francisco de Palafox y Rebolledo, Marquis of Ariza||?||?|| 
|-
|Jean Louis Paul de Noailles, Count of Ayen||1739||1824||later Duke of Ayen
|-
|rowspan=3|1780||Pierre Paul, marquis d'Ossun||1713||1788||French Ambassador to Spain
|-
|Filippo Colonna, 10 Duke of Paliano||1760||1818|| 
|-
|Prince Carlo Gennaro of Naples||1780||1789||son of King Ferdinand I of the Two Sicilies
|-
|1781||Prince Giuseppe of Naples||1781||1783||son of King Ferdinand I of the Two Sicilies
|-
|rowspan=6|1783||Carlos José Gutiérrez de los Ríos, 6th Count of Fernan Nuñez||1742||1795|| 
|-
|Armand Marc, Count of Montmorin de Saint-Herem||1745||1794|| 
|-
|Philip, Prince of Parma||1783||1786||son of Ferdinand, Duke of Parma
|-
|Louis Pierre Nolasque Berton des Balbes, Marquis of Crillon||1717||1796|| 
|-
|Infante Charles Francis of Spain||1783||1784||son of Charles, Prince of Asturias (Charles IV of Spain)
|-
|Infante Philip Francis of Spain||1783||1784||son of Charles, Prince of Asturias (Charles IV of Spain)
|-
|1784||Infante Ferdinand of Spain||1784||1833||later King Ferdinand VII of Spain. Head of the order from 1808
|-
|rowspan=5|1785||José, Prince of Brazil||1761||1788||son of Queen Maria I of Portugal
|-
|Infante John of Portugal||1769||1826||later King John VI of Portugal
|-
|Henri de Meneses, Count of Ericeyra and Marquis de Lourizal||?||?|| 
|-
|Philippe Louis Marc de Noailles, Prince of Poix||1752||1819|| 
|-
|Joaquín Antonio de Palafox y Rebolledo, Marquis of Ariza||?||1775|| 
|-
|1786||Infante Peter Charles Anthony of Spain||1786||1812||son of Gabriel de Borbón
|-
|rowspan=2|1788||Infante Carlos of Spain||1775||1855||First Carlist Claimant to the Throne of Spain
|-
|Prince Carlo Gennaro||1788||1789||son of King Ferdinand I of the Two Sicilies
|-
|rowspan=16|1789||Infante Charles John of Spain||1788||1789||son of Gabriel de Borbón
|-
|||1727||1798|| 
|-
|Salatore Montaperto Uberti Branciforte, Prince of Raffadali||?||1801|| 
|-
|Manuel José Pacheco Téllez Girón y Toledo||1732||1794|| 
|-
|Cristobal Pío Funes de Villapandro, Count of Atares||?||?|| 
|-
|Pedro Francisco Lujan Silva, Duke of Almodóvar||1727||1789|| 
|-
|Judas Tadeo Fernández de Miranda, 5th Marquis of Valdecarzana||?||1810|| 
|-
|Juan de Silva Rabatta, 14th Count of Cifuentes||?||1792|| 
|-
|Paul François de Quélen, Prince of Carency and Duke of Vauguyon||1746||1728|| 
|-
|||1749||1806|| 
|-
|Vicente Joaquín Osorio de Moscoso, 15th Marquis of Astorga, 11th Count of Altamira, Prince of Aracena and Duke of Sesa||1756||1816|| 
|-
|Juan Pablo de Aragón Azlor y Zapata de Calatayud, 11th Duke of Villahermosa, Duke of Palata and Count of Real||1730||1790|| 
|-
|Louis Henri, Duke of Bourbon||1756||1830|| 
|-
|Charles Roger, Prince of Bauffremont-Listenois||1713||1795|| 
|-
|Andrea IV Doria-Pamphili-Landi, Marquis of Torriglia and Melfi||1747||1820|| 
|-
|||1743||1803|| 
|-
|rowspan=3|1790||Diego Fernández de Velasco, 13th Duke of Frías and Uceda, Count of Alba and Lista||1754||1811|| 
|-
|Diego de Noronha||?||?|| 
|-
|Joseph Anne Auguste, Duke of Croy-Havré||1744||1839|| 
|-
|rowspan=5|1791||Francesco Augusto Cattaneo, Duke of Termoli and 4th Prince of San Nicandro||1721||1791|| 
|-
|José Álvarez de Toledo, Duke of Alba, 15th Duke of Medina Sidonia, 11th Duke of Montalto, 10th Duke of Bivona, 8th Duke of Fernandina||1756||1796|| 
|-
|José Monino, Count of Floridablanca||1728||1808|| 
|-
|Aususto Cattaneo, Duke of Termoli and 5th Prince of San Nicandro||1754||1824|| 
|-
|Infante Philip Maria of Spain||1792||1894||son of King Charles IV of Spain
|-
|rowspan=2|1792||Maximilian, Prince of Saxony||1759||1838|| 
|-
|Manuel de Godoy, Prince of the Peace||1767||1851|| 
|-
|rowspan=7|1794||Infante Francisco de Paula of Spain||1794||1865||son of King Charles IV of Spain
|-
|Carlo Sebastiano Ferrero Fieschi, Prince of Masserano||1760||1826|| 
|-
|Vicente María de Palafox, Marquis of Ariza||?||?|| 
|-
|Vicenzo Maria de Vera Aragon, Duke of la Rocca||?||?|| 
|-
|Francisco María del Castillo Horcasitas, Marquis of Villadarias||?||?|| 
|-
|Pedro Téllez-Girón, 9th Duke of Osuna||1755||1807|| 
|-
|Pablo de Sangro, Prince of Castelfranco||1760||1826|| 
|-
|rowspan=3|1795||Marquis of Oyra||?||?|| 
|-
|Miguel de la Grúa Talamanca, 1st Marquis of Branciforte||?||?|| 
|-
|Francis Anthony Pius, Prince of Beira||1795||1801||son of King John VI of Portugal
|-
|rowspan=2|1796||Luis Pinto de Sousa||?||?|| 
|-
|Antonio de Valdés y Fernández de Bazán||1744||1816|| 
|-
|1798||Bruno Domingo Simon, Count of Lalaing||1739||?|| 
|-
|rowspan=2|1799||Juan Manuel Álvarez de Faria y Sánchez de Zarzosa||1794||1865|| 
|-
|Charles, Prince of Parma||1760||1826||later King of Etruria, Duke of Lucca and Parma

19th Century

!Year of Induction!!Name!!Born!!Died!!Notes
|-
|1801||Peter of Portugal, Prince of Beira||1798||1834||later Emperor Peter I of Brazil and King Peter IV of Portugal
|-
|rowspan=3|1802||Prince Leopoldo Giovanni of the Two Siciles||1790||1851||son of King Ferdinand I of the Two Sicilies
|-
|Sir John Acton, Bt.||1736||1811|| 
|-
|Carlo Maria Caracciolo, Duke of San Teodoro||1764||1823|| 
|-
|1804||Infant Miguel of Portugal||1802||1866||later King Miguel of Portugal
|-
|rowspan=8|1805||Napoleon I, Emperor of the French||1769||1821|| 
|-
|Joseph Bonaparte||1768||1844||later King of Naples and Spain
|-
|Louis Bonaparte||1778||1846||later King of Holland
|-
|Felice Baciocchi, Prince of Lucca and Piombino||1762||1841|| 
|-
|Camillo Borghese, Prince of Sulmona and Rossano||1775||1832|| 
|-
|Joseph, Cardinal Fesch||1763||1839|| 
|-
|Joachim Murat||1767||1815||later King of Naples
|-
|Eugène de Beauharnais||1781||1824||Viceroy of Italy
|-
|1812||Arthur Wellesley, 1st Duke of Wellington, Prince of Waterloo, Duke of Ciudad Rodrigo and Marquis of Vimeiro||1769||1852|| 
|-
|rowspan=10|1814||José Miguel de Carvajal, 2nd Duke of San Carlos||1771||1828|| 
|-
|Alexander I, Emperor of Russia||1777||1825|| 
|-
|Frederick William III, King of Prussia||1770||1840|| 
|-
|George, Prince of Wales||1762||1830||Prince Regent of United Kingdom, later King George IV of the United Kingdom and Hanover
|-
|Charles Maurice de Talleyrand-Périgord, Prince of Talleyrand and Benevente||1754||1838|| 
|-
|William, Hereditary Prince of Orange||1792||1849||later King William II of the Netherlands
|-
|Louis-Antoine, Duke of Angoulême||1775||1844|| 
|-
|Charles-Ferdinand, Duke of Berry||1778||1820|| 
|-
|Charles XIII, King of Sweden||1748||1818|| 
|-
|||1779||1827|| 
|-
|rowspan=12|1816||Pedro Cevallos||1764||1840|| 
|-
|Dmitriy Tatistcheff||1767||1845||Russian diplomat
|-
|William I, King of the Netherlands||1772||1843|| 
|-
|Juan de la Cruz Belvis de Moncada, Marquis of Belgida||1756||1835|| 
|-
|Pedro de Alcántara Álvarez de Toledo, Count of Miranda and Duke Peneranda||1765||1824|| 
|-
|Ignacio de Arteaga e Idiáquez, Marquis of Valmediano||1748||1817|| 
|-
|Francisco de Meneses Silveira y Castro, Marquis of Valada||1754||1834|| 
|-
|Francisco de Paula Fernández de Córdoba, 18th Count of la Puebla del Maestre||1763||1824|| 
|-
|Nicola Caetano Jose Centurioni e Vera, Marquis of la Lapilla||1761||1834|| 
|-
|Francisco de Borja Idiaquez de Palafox, Duke of Granada and Ega||1769||1818|| 
|-
|Pedro de Alcántara de Toledo, 13th Duke of Infantado||1773||1841|| 
|-
|Joaquín Antonio Samaniego, Count of Torrejón and Marquis of Valverde||1769||1844|| 
|-
|rowspan=6|1817||Constantine, Tsesarevich and Grand Duke of Russia||1779||1831||  
|-
|Grand Duke Nicholas Pavlovich of Russia||1796||1855||later Emperor Nicholas I of Russia
|-
|Grand Duke Michael Pavlovich of Russia||1798||1849||son of Emperor Paul I of Russia
|-
|Antonio María Ponce de León, Duke of Montemar||1757||1826|| 
|-
|Augustin Pedro González Telmo Fernández de Híjar, Duke of Híjar||1773||1817|| 
|-
|Antonio Rocaberti de Dameto, Count of Peralada and Viscount of Rocaberti||1782||1825|| 
|-
|rowspan=4|1818||Infante Carlos Luis of Spain||1818||1861||Second Carlist Claimant to the throne of Spain, Count of Montemolin
|-
|Frederick William, Prince of Prussia||1795||1861||later King Frederick William IV of Prussia
|-
|Frederick VI, King of Denmark||1786||1839|| 
|-
|Ramón San Martín, Marquis of San Martin||1764||1826||
|-
|rowspan=6|1819||Antoine Claude de Noailles, Duke of Mouchy||1777||1846|| 
|-
|Fulco Ruffo di Calabria, 8th Prince of Scilla||1773||1852|| 
|-
|Tommaso Maria di Somma, 9th Marquis of Circello||1737||1826|| 
|-
|Frederick Augustus I, King of Saxony||1750||1827|| 
|-
|Francisco Ramón de Spes Fernández de Córdoba, Duke of Alagón||1758||1841|| 
|-
|Valentín Carlos, Marquis de Villanueva del Duero, Count of Villariezo||1762||1823|| 
|-
|rowspan=2|1820||Infante Francis of Spain||1820||1821||son of Infante Francisco de Paula of Spain
|-
|Luis María de Borbón y Vallabriga, 14th Count of Chinchón||1777||1823||Archbishop of Seville and Toledo, Cardinal.
|-
|rowspan=3|1821||José Gabriel Bazán de Silva, 10th Marquis of Santa Cruz||1782||1839|| 
|-
|Ferdinand, Duke of Noto||1810||1859||later Ferdinand II of the Two-Siciles
|-
|Anne Pierre, Prince of Montmorency-Laval||1768||1837|| 
|-
|rowspan=3|1822||Infante Francis of Spain||1822||1902||Duke of Cádiz, later King Consort of Spain
|-
|Infante Juan Carlos of Spain||1822||1887||son of Infante Carlos of Spain, the first Carlist Claimant
|-
|Charles XIV John, King of Sweden||1764||1844|| 
|-
|rowspan=10|1823||Ferdinand Charles, Prince of Lucca||1823||1854||later Duke Charles III of Parma
|-
|Infante Enrique of Spain||1823||1870||son of the Infante Francisco de Paula, youngest son of King Charles IV of Spain. Later Duke of Seville
|-
|Joaquín José Melgarejo de Ruiz Dávalos, Duke of San Fernando||1780||1835|| 
|-
|Charles Albert, Prince of Savoy-Carignan||1798||1849||later King of Sardinia
|-
|||1773||1850||French Ambassador to Spain
|-
|Infante Sebastian of Spain||1813||1875||son of Teresa, Princess of Beira and Infante Pedro Carlos of Spain
|-
|Carlo Andrea Pozzo di Borgo||1764||1842||Russian diplomat
|-
|Henri, Duke of Bordeaux||1820||1883||later the French legitimist pretender, count of Chambord
|-
|Jean Baptiste Guillaume, Count of Villèle||1773||1854|| 
|-
|François, Viscount of Chateaubriand||1768||1848|| 
|-
|rowspan=5|1824||Pedro de Sousa Holstein, Duke of Palmella||1781||1850|| 
|-
|Charles Robert, Count of Nesselrode||1780||1862||the Russian foreign minister
|-
|Christian Gunther, Count of Bernstorff||1769||1835|| 
|-
|Infante Ferdinand of Spain||1824||1861||son of the Infante Carlos of Spain, the first Carlist Claimant
|-
|Paul, Duke of Noailles and Ayen||1802||1885|| 
|-
|1825||Prince John of Saxony||1801||1873||later King John I of Saxony
|-
|rowspan=5|1826||Infante Edward Philip of Spain||1826||1830|| 
|-
|Charles, Prince of Capua||1811||1862||son of King Francis I of the Two-Sicilies
|-
|Leopold, Count of Syracuse||1813||1860||son of King Francis I of the Two-Sicilies
|-
|Grand Duke Alexander Nikolayevich of Russia||1818||1881||later Emperor Alexander II of Russia
|-
|Antonio, Count of Lecce||1814||1843||son of King Francis I of the Two-Sicilies
|-
|1827||José Antonio Aragon y Azlor, 12th Duke of Villahermosa, Duke of Palata and Count of Real||1785||1852|| 
|-
|rowspan=7|1829||Vicenze Maria Grifeo, Duke of Floridia, Prince of Partanna||?||?|| 
|-
|Luigi de' Medici dei Principi de Ottajano||1760||1830|| 
|-
|Donato, Marquis Tommasi and Casaliecho||?||?|| 
|-
|Pedro Gómez Labrador, Marquis of Labrador||1755||1852|| 
|-
|José Rafael Fadrique Fernández de Híjar, 13th Duke of Híjar||?||1863|| 
|-
|Francisco Castaños, 1st Duke of Bailén||1758||1852|| 
|-
|Francisco Tadeo Calomarde, Duke of Santa Isabel||1773||1842|| 
|-
|rowspan=3|1830||Auguste Pierre, Count of La Ferronays||1777||1842|| 
|-
|Louis, Duke of Aquila||1824||1897|| 
|-
|Francis, Count of Trapani||1827||1892|| 
|-
|rowspan=2|1832||Girolamo, Marquis Ruffo||?||?|| 
|-
|Prudencio de Guadalfajara, Duke of Castroterrano||?||?|| 
|-
|rowspan=2|1834||William IV, King of the United Kingdom and Hanover||1765||1837|| 
|-
|Louis Philippe, King of the French||1775||1850|| 
|-
|rowspan=6|1835||Leopold I, King of the Belgians||1790||1865|| 
|-
|Augustus, Prince of Leuchtenberg||1810||1835||1st husband of Queen Maria II of Portugal
|-
|Pedro II, Emperor of Brazil||1825||1891|| 
|-
|Otto, King of the Hellenes||1815||1867|| 
|-
|Bernardino José López Pacheco, 14th Duke of Frías||1783||1851|| 
|-
|Ferdinand Philippe, Duke of Orléans and Prince Royal of France||1810||1842||
|-
|1837||Ferdinand II, King-consort of Portugal||1816||1885||2nd husband of Queen Maria II of Portugal
|-
|rowspan=6|1838||Miguel Tacón, Duke of la Unión and Cuba||1775||1855|| 
|-
|Fernando de Aguillara, Marquis of Cerralbo||?||?|| 
|-
|Napoléon Louis de Talleyrand-Périgord, Duke of Valençay||1811||1898|| 
|-
|Juan Baptista de Queralt y Silva, Count of Santa Coloma||?||?|| 
|-
|Nicolas Jean de Dieu Soult||1769||1851|| 
|-
|Manuel Pando Fernandez de Pinedo, 2nd Marquis of Miraflores||1792||1872|| 
|-
|rowspan=2|1840||Christian VIII, King of Denmark||1786||1848|| 
|-
|Baldomero Espartero, Regent of Spain and Prince of Vergara||1793||1879|| 
|-
|1841||Albert of Saxe-Coburg and Gotha, Prince Consort of the United Kingdom||1819||1861|| 
|-
|1842||William Alexander, Prince of Orange||1817||1890||later King William III of the Netherlands
|-
|rowspan=3|1843||Salustiano de Olózaga||1803||1873|| 
|-
|Louis, Duke of Nemours||1814||1896||second son of the King Louis Philippe of the French
|-
|Diego Isidro Guzmán de la Cerda, 8th Marquis of Montealegre, Duke of Nájera||?||1849|| 
|-
|rowspan=3|1844||François Guizot||1787||1874||Prime Minister of France
|-
|Oscar I, King of Sweden||1799||1859|| 
|-
|Francis, Duke of Calabria||1836||1894||later King Francis II of the Two Sicilies
|-
|1845||Henri, Duke of Aumale||1822||1897|| 
|-
|rowspan=5|1846||Eugène Lamoral, Prince of Ligne||1804||1880|| 
|-
|Agustín Fernando Muñoz, Duke of Riánsares||1808||1873|| 
|-
|Antoine, Duke of Montpensier||1824||1890||youngest son of the King Louis Philippe of the French; husband of the Infanta Luisa, sister of Queen Isabella II of Spain
|-
|François, Prince of Joinville||1818||1900|| 
|-
|Pedro, Crown Prince of Portugal||1837||1861||later King Pedro V of Portugal
|-
|rowspan=2|1847||Ramón María Narváez y Campos, 1st Duke of Valencia||1800||1868|| 
|-
|José María Osorio de Mosco de Carvajal, 17th Duke of Sessa, 19th Duke of Trastamara and 14th Count of Altamira||1828||1881|| 
|-
|1848||Frederick VII, King of Denmark||1808||1863|| 
|-
|1849||Juan Roca de Togores, 3rd Count of Pinohermoso||1801||1883|| 
|-
|1850||Louis Napoleon Bonaparte, President of the French Republic||1808||1873||later Napoleon III, Emperor of the French. Co-Prince of Andorra.
|-
|rowspan=2|1851||Francisco Martinez de la Rosa||1787||1862|| 
|-
|Joaquín Fernández de Córdoba, 6th Duke of Arion||1787||1871|| 
|-
|rowspan=6|1852||Francisco Javier de Istúriz||1790||1871|| 
|-
|Nicolás de Osorio y Zayas, 16th Marquis of Alcañices, 15th Duke of Albuquerque and 15th Duke of Ledesma||1793||1866|| 
|-
|Juan Bravo Murillo||1803||1873|| 
|-
|Albert Edward, Prince of Wales||1841||1910||later King Edward VII of the United Kingdom, Emperor of India
|-
|Louis, Count of Trani||1838||1886|| 
|-
|Charles Louis, Count of Ficquelmont and of the Holy Roman Empire||1777||1857||heir from a prominent noble family from Lorraine, former imperial ambassador and former Minister-President of the Austrian Empire
|-
|1853||William, Prince of Prussia||1797||1888||later King William I of Prussia and German Emperor
|-
|1854||Robert, Duke of Parma||1848||1907|| 
|-
|1855||Charles, Crown Prince of Sweden||1826||1872||later King Charles XV of Sweden
|-
|rowspan=3|1856||Juan Carlos Francisco, Duke of Saldaña||1791||1876|| 
|-
|Napoleon, Prince Imperial||1856||1879||son of Emperor Napoleon III of France
|-
|Prince Adalbert of Bavaria||1828||1875||son of King Louis I of Bavaria
|-
|rowspan=3|1857||Nicholas, Tsarevich and Grand Duke of Russia||1843||1865|| 
|-
|Alexander, Prince Gorchakov||1798||1883||Foreign Minister of Russia
|-
|Alfonso, Prince of the Asturias||1857||1885||later King Alfonso XII of Spain. Head of the Order from 1870/1874
|-
|rowspan=2|1859||Infante Ferdinand of Spain||1859||1872||nephew of Queen Isabella II of Spain
|-
|Prince Ludwig Ferdinand of Bavaria||1859||1949|| 
|-
|rowspan=2|1860||Antonio Remón Zarco del Valle y Huet||1785||1866|| 
|-
|Mariano Téllez Girón, 12th Duke of Osuna and Infantado||1814||1882|| 
|-
|1861||Luís I, King of Portugal||1838||1889|| 
|-
|rowspan=2|1862||Frederick, Crown Prince of Prussia||1831||1888||later German Emperor Frederick III
|-
|Francisco, Duke of Marchena||1861||1923|| 
|-
|rowspan=2|1863||Louis III, Grand Duke of Hesse||1806||1877|| 
|-
|William Nicholas, Prince of Orange and Crown Prince of the Netherlands||1840||1879||
|-
|1864||Christian IX, King of Denmark||1818||1906|| 
|-
|rowspan=3|1865||Pedro José Pidal, 1st Marquis of Pidal||1800||1865|| 
|-
|Ángel Ramírez de Bapredano, 3rd Duke of Rivas||1791||1865|| 
|-
|||1813||1873|| 
|-
|rowspan=8|1866||George V, King of Hanover||1819||1878|| 
|-
|Prince Friedrich Karl of Prussia||1801||1883|| 
|-
|Alexander, Tsarevich and Grand Duke of Russia||1845||1894||later Emperor Alexander III of Russia
|-
|Leopold Ferdinand, Count of Hainaut||1859||1869||son of King Leopold II of the Belgians
|-
|Francisco Serrano y Domínguez, Duke de la Torre||1810||1885|| 
|-
|Pedro Colón, Duke of Veragua||?||?|| 
|-
|Fernando Díaz de Mendoza y Valcárcel, Count of Lalaing de Balazote||1810||1884|| 
|-
|Carlos, Crown Prince of Portugal||1863||1908||later King Carlos of Portugal
|-
|1867||Luis González Bravo||1811||1871|| 
|-
|rowspan=4|1868||Gaetano, Count of Girgenti||1846||1871||Son-in-law of Queen Isabella II of Spain
|-
|Manuel Seijas Lozano||1800||1868|| 
|-
|Lorenzo Arrazola||1797||1873|| 
|-
|Francisco Javier Arias Dávila Matheu, Count of Punonrostro||1812||1890|| 
|-
|rowspan=5|1870||Pedro Gómez de la Serna||1806||1871|| 
|-
|Casimiro Vigodet y Guernica||1787||1872|| 
|-
|Abdulaziz (عبد العزيز), Sultan of the Ottoman Empire||1830||1876|| 
|-
|Muhammad III as-Sadiq (محمد الصادق بن حسين), Bey of Tunis||1813||1882|| 
|-
|Amadeo I, King of Spain||1845||1890|| 
|-
|rowspan=4|1871||Eugenio Emanuele Prince of Savoy-Carignan||1816||1888|| 
|-
|Adolphe Thiers, President of the French Republic||1797||1877||Co-Prince of Andorra
|-
|George I, King of the Hellenes||1845||1913|| 
|-
|Frederick Charles, Prince of Prussia|| 1828|| 1885|| 
|-
|rowspan=6|1872||Pedro Gómez de la Serna||1828||1885|| 
|-
|Prince Philippe, Count of Flanders||1837||1905||son of King Leopold I of the Belgians
|-
|||1856||1927|| 
|-
|||1807||1878||President of the Supreme Court of Spain
|-
|Antonio de los Ríos y Rosas||1812||1873|| 
|-
|Oscar II, King of Sweden||1829||1907|| 
|-
|rowspan=12|1875||Juan Manuel González de la Pezuela, Count of Cheste||1809||1906||
|-
|José Osorio y Silva, Marquis of Alcañices, Sexto and Alburquerque||1825||1910||
|-
|Alejandro Mon y Martínez||1801||1882||
|-
|Mariano Roca de Togores, Marquis de Molins, Viscount of Rocamora||1812||1889||
|-
|Manuel Pavia y Lacy, 1st Marquis de Novaliches||1814||1896||
|-
|Patrice MacMahon, President of the French Republic||1808||1893||Duke of Magenta and Marshal of France. Co-Prince of Andorra
|-
|Otto von Bismarck, Prince of Bismarck||1815||1898|| Minister-President of Prussia and Chancellor of German Empire
|-
|Charles Alexander, Grand Duke of Saxe-Weimar-Eisenach||1818||1901||
|-
|Cardinal James Santiago Antonelli||1806||1876||
|-
|Alexander, Count of Adlerberg||1818||1884||
|-
|William, Prince of Prussia||1859||1941||later German Emperor William II
|-
|Antonio Cánovas del Castillo||1828||1897||
|-
|1877||Francisco de Borja Bazán de Silva, 11th Marquis of Santa Cruz||1815||1889||
|-
|rowspan=6|1878||Francisco Santa Cruz y Pacheco||1797||1883||
|-
|Juan Zavala y de la Puente, Marquis of Sierra Bullones||1804||1879||
|-
|Manuel García, Marquis of Barzanallana||1817||1892||
|-
|Frederick I, Grand Duke of Baden||1826||1907||
|-
|Arsenio Martínez Campos||1831||1900||
|-
|Victor Emmanuel, Prince of Italy||1869||1947||later King Victor Emmanuel III of Italy
|-
|1879||Antonio Maria Fontes Pereria de Mello||1819||1887||
|-
|rowspan=2|1880||Abdul Hamid II (عبد الحميد ثانی), Sultan of the Ottoman Empire||1842||1918||
|-
|Antonio d'Orléans, Infant of Spain, Duke of Galliera||1866||1930||brother-in-law of King Alfonso XII of Spain
|-
|rowspan=3|1881||Gaston d'Orléans, Count of Eu||1842||1922||
|-
|||1821||1883||
|-
|Gustaf, Crown Prince of Sweden||1858||1950||later King Gustaf V of Sweden
|-
|1882||Jules Grévy, President of the French Republic||1807||1891||Co-Prince of Andorra
|-
|rowspan=5|1883||Nicholas, Tsarevitch and Grand Duke of Russia||1868||1918||later Emperor Nicholas II of Russia
|-
|Frederick, Crown Prince of Denmark||1843||1912||later King Frederick VIII of Denmark
|-
|Prince Heinrich of Prussia||1862||1929||
|-
|Emperor Meiji of Japan (明治天皇)||1852||1912||Mutsuhito (personal name)
|-
|Infante Alfonso of Portugal, Duke of Porto||1865||1920||
|-
|rowspan=3|1884||José Posada Herrera||1815||1885||
|-
|Fernando Calderón de la Barca y Collantes, Marquis of Reinosa||1811||1890||
|-
|Rafael de Bustos et Castillo, Marquis of Corvera||1807||1894||
|-
|rowspan=4|1886||Alfonso XIII, King of Spain||1886||1941||posthumous son of Alfonso XII of Spain, King and Grand Master of the Order at his birth (nominal until 1902)
|-
|Infante Augusto of Portugal, Duke of Coimbra||1847||1889||
|-
|Cardinal Louis Jacobini||1832||1887||
|-
|José Gutierrez de la Concha, 1st Marquis of La Habana||1809||1895||
|-
|rowspan=3|1888||Thomas, 2nd Duke of Genoa||1854||1931||
|-
|Charles I, King of Württemberg||1823||1891||
|-
|Alfred, Duke of Edinburgh||1844||1900||
|-
|1889||Constantine, Crown Prince of Greece||1868||1923||later King Constantine I of the Hellenes
|-
|1890||José Joaquín Álvarez de Toledo, 18th Duke of Medina Sidonia||1826||1900||
|-
|rowspan=3|1891||Práxedes Mateo Sagasta||1827||1903||
|-
|Vladimir Alexandrovitch, Grand Duke of Russia||1847||1909||
|-
|Albert, Prince of Prussia, Regent of the Duchy of Brunswick||1837||1906||
|-
|rowspan=3|1892||William II, King of Württemberg||1848||1921||
|-
|Cristóbal Colón de la Cerday Gante, Duke of Veragua and Marquis of Jamaica||1837||1910||
|-
|Prince Luís Filipe of Portugal, Duke of Braganza||1887||1908||
|-
|1893||George, Prince of the United Kingdom and Duke of York||1865||1936||later King George V of the United Kingdom and British dominions beyond the seas, Emperor of India
|-
|rowspan=3|1895||Guillermo Chacón y Maldonado||1813||1899||
|-
|José Elduayen y Gorriti, Marquis of Pazo de la Merced||1823||1898||
|-
|Eugenio Montero Ríos||1832||1914||
|-
|rowspan=2|1896||George Alexandrovitch, Grand Duke of Russia||1871||1899||
|-
|Yoshihito, Crown Prince of Japan (嘉仁)||1879||1926||later Emperor Taishō (大正天皇) of Japan
|-
|1897||Ferdinand, Duke of Calabria||1869||1960||
|-
|1898||Félix Faure, President of the French Republic||1841||1899||Co-Prince of Andorra
|-
|rowspan=4|1900||Wilhelm, Crown Prince of Germany||1882||1951||
|-
|Enrique Ramírez de Saaveda y Cueto, 4th Duke of Rivas and Marquis de Andia||1828||1914||
|-
|Carlos María Stuart Fitz James y Portocarrero, 9th Duke of Berwick and 16th Duke of Alba||1849||1901||
|-
|Alejandro Llorente y Lamas||1814||1901||

20th Century

!Year of Induction!!Name!!Born!!Died!!Notes
|-
|rowspan=4|1901||Charles of Bourbon-Sicily, Infante of Spain||1870||1949||husband of Mercedes, Princess of Asturias
|-
|Christian, Prince of Denmark||1870||1947||later King Christian X of Denmark
|-
|Infante Alfonso of Spain, Duke of Calabria||1901||1964||son of Mercedes, Princess of Asturias
|-
|Grand Duke Michael Alexandrovich of Russia||1878||1918||
|-
|rowspan=7|1902||Carlos Martinez de Irujo, Duke of Sotomayor and Marquis of Casa-Irujo||1846||1909||
|-
|Prince Eugén, Duke of Närke||1865||1947||
|-
|Arthur William, Prince of the United Kingdom and Duke of Connaught and Strathearn||1850||1942||
|-
|Vajiravudh, Crown Prince of Siam||1881||1925||later King Vajiravudh of Siam (พระบาทสมเด็จพระมงกุฎเกล้าเจ้าอยู่หัว) also known as Rama VI
|-
|Émile Loubet, President of the French Republic||1838||1929||Co-Prince of Andorra. Invested by the Duke of Sesto, special representative, on 22 June 1902 at Paris.
|-
|Ernest Augustus, Crown Prince of Hanover||1845||1923||
|-
|Mozaffar al-Din  (مظفرالدين شاه قاجار), Shah of Persia||1853||1907||
|-
| rowspan=6|1903||Ferdinand Maria of the Two Siciles, Infante of Spain||1903||1905||son of Prince Carlos of Bourbon-Two Sicilies
|-
|Carlos Valcárcel y Ussel de Guimbarda||1819||1903||
|-
|Honorio de Samaniego y Pando, Conde de Villapaterna||1833||1917||
|-
|Don Alejandro Pidal y Mon||1846||1913||
|-
|Antonio de Aguilar y Correa, Marquis of la Vega de Armijo||1824||1908||
|-
|Ernesto Rodolfo Hintze Ribeiro||1849||1907||
|-
|1904||Marcelo Azcárraga y Palmero||1832||1915||
|-
|rowspan=2|1905||Ferdinand Maria, Prince of Bavaria and Infante of Spain||1884||1958||husband of Infanta Maria Teresa of Spain
|-
|Bernard Henri, Prince of Bülow||1849||1929||
|-
|1906||Prince Alfons of Bavaria||1862||1933||
|-
|rowspan=2|1907||Alfonso, Prince of Asturias||1907||1938||
|-
|Alfonso Maria d'Orléans, Infante of Spain||1886||1975||
|-
|rowspan=3|1908||Manuel II, King of Portugal||1889||1932||
|-
|José López Domínguez||1829||1911||
|-
|Fernando Primo de Rivera y Sobremonte, Marquis of Estrella||1831||1921||
|-
|1909||Adalbert, Prince of Bavaria||1886||1970||
|-
|rowspan=4|1910||Gustav, Crown Prince of Sweden||1882||1973||later King Gustav VI of Sweden
|-
|Haakon VII, King of Norway||1872||1957||
|-
|Ernest Louis, Grand Duke of Hesse||1868||1937||
|-
|Fernando León y Castillo, Marquis of the Muni||1842||1918||
|-
|rowspan=5|1911||José Messía y Gayoso de los Cobos, 4th Duke of Tamales||1853||1917||
|-
|Alejandro Groizard y Gómez de la Serna||1830||1919||
|-
|Andrés Avelino Salabert Ortega, 8th Marquis of la Torrecilla||1864||1925||
|-
|Manuel Aguirre de Tejada O'Neal y Eulato, 1st Count of Tejada de Valdeosera||1827||1911||
|-
|José de Echegaray Eizaguire||1832||1916||
|-
|1912||Edward, Prince of Wales||1894||1972||later King Edward VIII of the United Kingdom and British dominions beyond the seas, Emperor of India (1936) and Duke of Windsor (from 1936)
|-
|rowspan=4|1913||Raymond Poincaré, President of the French Republic||1860||1934||Co-Prince of Andorra
|-
|Francisco Javier Azlor-Aragón e Idiaquez, Duke of Granada de Ega ||1842||1919||
|-
|Luis Pidal y Mon, 2nd Marquis of Pidal||1842||1913||
|-
|Valeriano Weyler y Nicolay, Marquis of Tenerife and Duke of Rubi||1838||1930||
|-
|rowspan=5|1914||Juan Bautista Viniegra y Mendoza||1842||1918||
|-
|Manuel Falcó Osorio de Adda y Gutiérrez de los Ríos, Marquis of Mina and Duke of Fernán Nuñez||1856||1927||
|-
|Claudio López y Bru, 2nd Marquis of Comillas||1853||1925||
|-
|Philippe Emmanuel d'Orléans, Duke of Vendôme||1872||1931||
|-
|Etienne, Prince of Croy-Solre||1872||1932||
|-
|1915||Fermín de Lasala y Collado, Duke of Mandas and Villanueva||1830||1917||
|-
|rowspan=2|1916||Prince Filippo Maria of the Two Siciles||1847||1922||son of Prince Louis, Count of Aquila
|-
|Joaquín Ignacio de Arteaga y Echagüe, 17th Duke of Infantado||1870||1948||
|-
|rowspan=3|1919||Prince Gennaro of the Two Sicilies||1882||1944||son of Prince Alfonso, Count of Caserta
|-
|Prince Ranieri of the Two Sicilies||1883||1973||later Head of the House of the Two Sicilies and Duke of Castro
|-
|Alberto Manso de Velasco y Chaves, Count of Superonda||1828||?||
|-
|rowspan=2|1920||Antonio Maura y Montaner||1853||1925||
|-
|Prince Gabriel of the Two Sicilies||1897||1975||son of Prince Alfonso, Count of Caserta
|-
|1921||Infante Jaime of Spain||1908||1974||later Duke of Segovia
|-
|rowspan=3|1923||Leopold, Crown Prince of Belgium and Duke of Brabant||1901||1983||later King Leopold III of the Belgians (until 1951)
|-
|Luis Alfonso of Bavaria, Infante of Spain||1906||1983||son of Infanta María Teresa of Spain
|-
|Umberto, Prince of Piedmont||1904||1983||later King Umberto II of Italy
|-
|rowspan=2|1924||Hendrik of Mecklenburg-Schwerin, Prince Consort of the Netherlands||1876||1934||
|-
|José Eugenio of Bavaria, Infante of Spain||1909||1966||son of Infanta María Teresa of Spain
|-
|rowspan=2|1925||Albert Henry of Bourbon and Castelvi, 1st Duke of Santa Elena|||1854||1939||son of Henri of Borbón, Duke of Seville
|-
|Galeazzo von Thun und Hohenstein, Grand Master of the Order of Malta||1850||1931||
|-
|rowspan=3|1926||Jacobo Stuart Fitz-James y Falcó, 10th Duke of Berwick and 17th Duke of Alba||1878||1954||
|-
|Gaston Doumergue, President of the French Republic||1863||1937||
|-
|José de Saaverda et Salamanca, 2nd Marquis of Viana||1870||1927||
|-
|rowspan=4|1927||Francisco de Paula de Borbón y Castellví||1853||1942||son of Infante Enrique, Duke of Seville
|-
|Infante Juan of Spain||1913||1993||later Head of the Spanish Royal House and Claimant to the Throne (1941–1977), Count of Barcelona. Head of the Order from 1941 to 1977
|-
|Infante Gonzalo of Spain||1914||1934||son of King Alfonso XIII of Spain
|-
|Mariano de Silva y Carvajal Fernández de Córdoba y Salabert, 13th Marquis of Santa Cruz||1875||1940||
|-
|1928||Emperor Shōwa of Japan (昭和天皇) ||1901||1989||Hirohito (personal name)
|-
|1929||||1880||1956||
|-
|1930||Ernest Louis Henry Lamoral, Prince of Ligne||1857||1937||
|-
|rowspan=4|1931||Paul von Hindenburg, President of Germany||1847||1934||
|-
|Carlos María Cortezo y Prieto||1850||1933||
|-
|Juan Bautista Aznar Cabañas||1860||1933||
|-
|Luis de Silva y Carvajal, Duke of Mircanda and Count of la Unión||1876||1935||
|-
|1941||Infante Juan Carlos of Spain||1938||-||later King Juan Carlos of Spain. 20th Head and Sovereign of the Order of the Golden Fleece
|-
|1960||King Baudouin of the Belgians - 1, 171st Knight||1930||1993||
|-
|1962||Paul, King of the Hellenes||1901||1964||
|-
|rowspan=3|1964||Robert II, Duke of Parma ||1909||1974||
|-
|Carlos, Duke of Calabria||1938||2015||
|-
|Constantine II, King of the Hellenes||1940||2023||Monarch of Greece until 1973
|-
| rowspan=3|1977||Nicolás Cotoner y Cotoner, Marquis of Mondéjar||1905||1996||
|-
|Torcuato Fernández-Miranda y Hevia, 1st Duke of Fernández-Miranda||1915||1980||
|-
|Beltrán Osorio y Díez de Rivera, Duke of Alburquerque||1919||1994||
|-
| rowspan=2|1981||Felipe, Prince of Asturias||1968||-||later King Felipe VI of Spain. 21st Head and Sovereign of the Order of the Golden Fleece
|-
|José María Pemán||1897||1981||
|-
|1982||Olav V, King of Norway||1903||1991||
|-
| rowspan=2|1983||King Carl XVI Gustaf of Sweden - 1, 183rd Knight||1946||-||
|-
|Jean, Grand Duke of Luxembourg||1921||2019||Monarch until 2000
|-
|rowspan=4|1985||Emperor Akihito of Japan - 1, 185th Knight||1933||-||Honoured as Crown Prince of Japan. Monarch (1989-2019)
|-
|King Hussein of Jordan - 1, 186th Knight||1935||1999||
|-
|Princess Beatrix of the Netherlands - 1, 187th Knight||1938||-||Former Monarch of the Netherlands, Aruba, Curaçao and Sint Maarten until Abdication in 2013.
|-
|Queen Margrethe II of Denmark - 1, 188th Knight||1940||-||Monarch of Denmark, Greenland and the Faroe Islands since 1972.
|-
|1988||Queen Elizabeth II of the United Kingdom - 1,189th Knight||1926||2022||also Queen of Canada, Australia, New Zealand, Jamaica, Bahamas, Grenada, the Solomon Islands, Tuvalu, Saint Lucia, Saint Vincent and the Grenadines, Belize, Antigua and Barbuda, Papua New Guinea, and Saint Kitts and Nevis since 1952.
|-
|1994||King Albert II - 1, 190th Knight||1934||-||Monarch of Belgium until Abdication in 2013.
|-
|1995||King Harald V of Norway - 1, 191st Knight||1937||-||
|-

21st Century 

!Year of Induction!!Name!!Born!!Died!!Notes
|-
|2004||Simeon Saxe-Coburg-Gotha - 1,192nd Knight||1937||-|| King of Bulgaria (1943–1946) and Prime Minister of Bulgaria (2001–2005)
|-
|2006||King Bhumibol Adulyadej of Thailand - 1,193rd Knight ||1927||2016||
|-
|rowspan=3|2007||Grand Duke Henri of Luxembourg - 1,194th Knight||1955||-||
|-
|Adolfo Suárez, Duke of Suárez - 1,195th Knight||1932||2014|| Prime Minister of Spain (1976-1981)
|-
|Abdullah, King of Saudi Arabia - 1,196th Knight||1924||2015|| The Custodian of the Two Holy Mosques
|-
|rowspan=2|2010||Javier Solana - 1,197th Knight||1942||-|| Secretary General of NATO (1995–1999) and High Representative for Common Foreign and Security Policy (1999–2009)
|-
|Víctor García de la Concha - 1,198th Knight||1934||-|| Director of the Real Academia Española (1998–2010)
|-
|2011||Nicolas Sarkozy, President of the French Republic - 1,199th Knight||1955||-|| Co-Prince of Andorra
|-
|2014||Enrique Valentín Iglesias - 1,200th Knight||1930 ||-|| President of the Inter-American Development Bank (1988–2005)
|-
|2015||Leonor, Princess of Asturias  - 1,201st Knight||2005||-||

Knights of the Austrian Golden Fleece

18th Century

!Year of Induction!!Name!!Born!!Died!!Notes
|-
|rowspan=19|1712||Rinaldo III, Duke of Modena and Reggio||1655||1737||Son of Francesco I d'Este and nephew of Maffeo Barberini; both Knights of the Golden Fleece.
|-
|Vincent Gonzague, Duke of Gustalla||1634||1714|| 
|-
|Thomas Emmanuel, Prince of Savoy-Carignan||1687||1729||
|-
|Wenceslaus Norbert, Count of Kinsky||1642||1719||
|-
|Charles Maximilian, Count of Tour and Valsassina||1643||1716||
|-
|Philip Louis, Count of Sinzendorf||1671||1742||
|-
|Gundacre, Count of Starhemberg||1663||1745||
|-
|Charles Joseph, Count of Paar||1654||1725||
|-
|Fernando de Silva, 13th Count of Cifuentes||1663||1749||
|-
|Adam Franz Karl, Prince of Schwarzenberg||1680|| 1732||
|-
|Nicholas, Count of Palffy and Palatine of Hungary||1657||1732||
|-
|Norbert Leopold, Count of Kolowrat||1655||1716||
|-
|Vicente Pedro Álvarez de Toledo y Portugal, 10th Count of Oropesa||1687||1728||
|-
|Wirrich Philip, Count of Daun, Prince of Teano||1668||1741||
|-
|Giuseppe Sanseverino, 9th Prince of Bisignano||?||1727||
|-
|Francis de Blanes, Count of Centelles||?||?||
|-
|John Baptist, Count of Colloredo||1656||1729||
|-
|Livio, Prince Odescalchi||1652||1713||
|-
|Paolo di Sangro, Prince of San Severo||1657||1726||
|-
||1715||Charles Albert of Bavaria||1697||1745||later Elector of Bavaria and Emperor Charles VII
|-
|1716||Leopold John, Archduke of Austria||1716||1716||Infant son of Charles VI, Holy Roman Emperor
|-
|rowspan=25|1721||Augustus III, King of Poland and Saxony||1696||1763||
|-
|Infante Manuel of Portugal, Count of Ourém||1714||1777||
|-
|Maximilian William, Duke of Hanover-Brunswick and Lunebourg||1666||1726||son of Prince Elector Ernest Augustus, Elector of Brunswick-Lüneburg
|-
|Leopold Clement Charles, Hereditary Prince of Lorraine||1707||1723||son of Duke Leopold of Lorraine
|-
|Joseph Charles of Bavaria, Count Palatine and Hereditary Prince of Sulzbach||1694||1729||
|-
|Ferdinand Marie, Duke of Bavaria||1699||1738||son of Elector Maximilian II Emanuel of Bavaria
|-
|Leopold, Prince of Schleswig-Holstein||1674||1744||
|-
|Alexander, Prince of Württemberg||1684||1737||
|-
|Joseph Folch, Prince of Cardona||1651||1729||
|-
|Maximilan Guidobalde, Count of Martinitz||?||1733||
|-
|Leopold, Count of Herberstein||1655||1728||
|-
|Philip Francis, Prince de Rubempré||1669||1742||
|-
|Fabrizio Colonna, 8th Prince of Paliano||1700||1785||
|-
|Leopold, Count of Schlick||1663||1723||
|-
|Sigismund Frederick, Count of Khevenhuller||1666||1742||
|-
|Claude Lamoral, Prince de Ligne||1685||1766||
|-
|Forben Ferdinand, Prince of Fürstenberg||1664||1741||
|-
|Manuel María de Silva Mendoza y Toledo, X conde Galve||1677||1728||son of Gregorio María de Silva y Mendoza, 9th Duke of the Infantado
|-
|Jules, Count of Visconti-Borromeo||1664||1741||
|-
|Joseph, Prince of Liechtenstein||1690||1732||
|-
|John Joseph, Count of Wrtby||?||1734||
|-
|Marino Francesco Caracciolo, 6th Prince of Avellino||1688||1727||
|-
|John Anthony de Buxador, Count of Savalla||1673||1745||
|-
|Alfonso, Prince of Cardenas and Count of Acerra||1680||1742||
|-
|George Thomas, Count of Starhemberg||?||?||
|-
|1723||Francis I, Hereditary Prince of Lorraine||1708||1765||later Emperor Francis I. Head of the order from 1740
|-
|1729||Prince Charles Alexander of Lorraine||1712||1780||Governor of the Austrian Netherlands and Grand Master of the Teutonic Order
|-
|rowspan=24|1731||Theodore of Bavaria, Count Palatine of Sulzbach||1659||1733||
|-
|Ludwig Georg Simpert, Margrave of Baden-Baden||1702||1761||
|-
|Francesco III d'Este, 12th Duke of Modena||1698||1780||
|-
|Prince Eugene Francis of Savoy, Duke of Troppau and Piedmont||1714||1734||
|-
|Philip, Prince of Lobkowicz||1680||1737||
|-
|Walther Xavier, Prince of Dietrichstein||1664||1738||
|-
|Joseph Ignatius, Count of Paar||1660||1735||
|-
|||1664||1742||
|-
|Louis Sanseverino, 10th Prince of Bisignano||1705||?||
|-
|Francis Ferdinand, Count of Kinsky||1678||1741||
|-
|Anselm Franz, 2nd Prince of Thurn and Taxis||1670||1739||
|-
|Adolf Bernard, Count of Martinitz||1680||1735||
|-
|Joseph de Norona, Count of Montesanto||? ||?||
|-
|Diego Pignatelli Aragona, 9th Duke of Monteleone||1687||1750||
|-
|Johann Antoine, Count of Schaffgotsch||1675||1742||
|-
|Lothar Joseph, Count of Königsegg||1673||1751||
|-
|Giulio Antonio d'Acquaviva d'Aragona, Count of Conversano||1691||1746||
|-
|François Honoré Bonanno del Bosco, Prince di Cattolica||?||1739||
|-
|Scipion Pubblicola, Prince of Santa Croce||?||?||
|-
|Ferdinand, Count of Plettenberg||1690||1737||
|-
|Francis Erwin, Count of Schönborn||1677||1754||
|-
|Antonio Tolomeo de Gallio Trivulzio, Prince of Musocco||1692||1767||
|-
|Antonio Diego de Portugal Toledo, Count of Alcaudete||1688||1734||
|-
|Adriano Antonio Carafa, Duke of Traétto||1696||1765||
|-
|1732||Joseph Adam, Prince of Schwarzenberg||1722||1782||
|-
|1734||Theodor, Prince of Lubomirski||1683||1745||
|-
|1735||Joseph Anton, 6th Prince of Belmonte, 1st Prince of the Holy Roman Empire||1685||1771||
|-
|rowspan=21|1739||Karl Eugen, Duke of Württemberg||1728||1793||
|-
|Ernest, Duke of Saxe-Hildburghausen||1707||1745||
|-
|Henri, Prince of Auersperg||1697||1783||
|-
|Josef Wenzel, Prince of Liechtenstein||1696||1772||
|-
|Johann, Count of Pálffy||1664||1751||
|-
|Johann Georg, Prince of Lobkowicz||1686||1755||
|-
|Johann Franz, Count of Dietrichstein||1671||1755||
|-
|Joseph Wilhelm Ernst, Prince of Fürstenberg||1699||1762||
|-
|Marc, Prince of Craon||1679||1754||
|-
|Johann Ernest, Count of Schaffgotsch||1685||1747||
|-
|Leopold Victorinus, Count of Windisch-Graetz||1686||1746||
|-
|Johann Wilhelm, Count of Wurmbrand||1670||1750||
|-
|John Vasily, Count of Castellvi de Cervellon||1673||1754||
|-
|||1665||1747||
|-
|John Descaller y Diesbach, Marquis of Pesora||1685||1766||
|-
|Nicholas, Prince of Salm-Salm and Duke of Hoogstraten||1701||1770||
|-
|Ferdinand, Prince of Pignatelli Strongoli||1689||1767||
|-
|Luzio, Count of Sangro and San Severo||1677||1767||
|-
|Ambrogio Caracciolo d'Avelino, Prince of Torchiarolo||1699||1748||
|-
|Cristiano, Count of Stampa and Montecastello||1712||1744||
|-
|Michael John, Count of Althan||1710||?||
|-
|1741||Archduke Joseph of Austria||1741||1790||later Emperor Joseph II. Head of the order from 1765
|-
|rowspan=16|1744||Paulus Antonius, Prince of Esterházy||1711||1762||
|-
|Franz Antonius, Prince of Lamberg||1678||1759||
|-
|Antonius Corfitz, Count of Ulfeld||1699||1760||
|-
|Louis Andreas, Count of Khevenhuller||1683||1744||
|-
|Maximilian Udalric, Count of Kaunitz||1679||1746||
|-
|Frederick, Count of Harrach||1696||1749||
|-
|Ferdinand Leopold, Count of Heberstein||1695||1744||
|-
|Otto Ferdinand, Count of Abensberg und Traun||1677||1748||
|-
|Louis, Count Batthyany||1696||1763||
|-
|Philipp Joseph, Count of Kinsky||1700||1749||
|-
|Rudolf Joseph, Count of Colloredo||1706||1788||
|-
|Johann Joseph, Count of Khevenhuller||1706||1776||
|-
|Immanuel, Duke of Silva Tarouca||1699||1771||
|-
|Charles, Count of Königsegg-Erps||1696||1759||
|-
|Wilhelm, Count of Sinzendorf||1697||1766||
|-
|Eugène-Hyacinthe de Lannoy, 5th Count of la Motterie||1686||1755||
|-
|rowspan=9|1749||Charles, Prince of Dietrichstein||1702||1784||
|-
|Emanuel, Prince of Liechtenstein||1700||1771||
|-
|Alexander Ferdinand, 3rd Prince of Thurn and Taxis||1704||1773||
|-
|Johann Wilhelm, Prince of Trautson and Count of Falkenstein||1700||1775||
|-
|Charles, Count Batthyany||1697||1772||
|-
|Wenzel Anton, Count (later Prince) of Kaunitz-Reitberg||1711||1794||
|-
|Maximilian Immanuel, Prince de Hornes||1695||1763||
|-
|Ferdinand, Count of Harrach||1708||1778||
|-
|Georg, Count of Erdöd||1674||1753||
|-
|1751||Ercole III d'Este, 13th Duke of Modena||1727||1803||
|-
|rowspan=9|1753||Wilhelm Reinhard, Count of Neipperg||1684||1774||
|-
|François Joseph de Choiseul, Marquis of Stainville||1694||1770||
|-
|Gaspar Fernández, Count of Cordon and Alagon||1674||1753||
|-
|Ferdinand-Gaston Joseph, Duke of Croy||1709||1767||
|-
|Francis Louis, Count of Salburg||?||?||
|-
|Leopold, Count of Daun||1705||1766||
|-
|Giovanluca, Count of Pallavicini||1697||1773||
|-
|Filipo Doria Sforza Visconti||1710||1786||
|-
|Francesco, Count of Montecuccoli-Caprara||?||?||
|-
|rowspan=2|1755||Archduke Charles Joseph of Austria||1745||1761||son of Empress Maria Theresa
|-
|Archduke Peter Leopold of Austria||1747||1792||later Emperor Leopold II. Head of the order from 1790
|-
|rowspan=2|1757||Charles, 5th Duke of Arenberg||1721||1778||
|-
|Maximilian Ulysses, Reichsgraf von Browne, Baron de Camus and Mountany||1705||1757||
|-
| rowspan=14|1759||Johann Karl Philipp, Graf von Cobenzl||1712||1770||
|-
|Georg Adam, Count (later Prince) of Starhemberg||1724||1807||
|-
|Constantine, Landgrave of Hesse-Rotenburg||1716||1778||
|-
|Frederick of Bavaria, Prince Palatine of Zweibrücken||1724||1767||
|-
|Agostino, Prince of Chigi and Farnese||1710||1769||
|-
|Frederick Ferdinand, Count of Leyen and Hohengeroldeck||1709||1760||
|-
|Charles Immanuel, Prince of Gavre||1696||1773||
|-
|Friedrich Wilhelm, Count of Haugwitz||1700||1765||
|-
|Nicholas, Count of Palffy||1710||1773||
|-
|Philippe Krakowsky, Count of Kolowrat||1688||1773||
|-
|Charles, Count of Bruener||?||1796||
|-
|||1708||1771||
|-
|Antonio, Marquis of Caerici and Cavenago||1715||1768||
|-
|Alessandro, Prince of Ruspoli and 2nd Prince of Cerveteri||1709||1779||
|-
|1762||August Georg, Margrave of Baden-Baden||1706||1771||
|-
|rowspan=14|1763||Archduke Ferdinand Charles of Austria||1754||1806||
|-
|Archduke Maximilian Franz of Austria||1756||1801||
|-
|Livio, Prince Odescalchi and Duke of Bracciano||1725||1805||
|-
|Charles, Count of Firmian||1715||1782||
|-
|Anthony, Count of Belgiojsos||1693||1779||later Prince of Belgiojsos
|-
|Francis, Count of Orsini and Rosenberg||1723||1796||
|-
|Charles, Count of Ogara||?||?||
|-
|Nicholas, Count of Esterházy||1711||1764||
|-
|Philipp Joseph, Count of Künigl||1696||1770||
|-
|Ferdinand Charles, Count of Aspremont-Lynden||1689||1772||
|-
|||1705||1787||
|-
|Rudolf, Count of Korzensky of Tereschau||?||?||
|-
|Francis Leopold, Count of Buquoy||1703||1768||
|-
|Franz Philipp, Count of Sternberg||1708||1786||
|-
|rowspan=9|1765||Jean Charles Joseph, Count of Merode, Marquis of Deynze||1719||1774||
|-
|Jean Baptiste, Count of Serbelloni and Castiglione||1697||1778||
|-
|Nicholas, Prince Esterházy||1714||1790||
|-
|Antonius, Count of Salm-Reifferscheidt||1728||1769||
|-
|Franz Wencel, Count of Wallis||1696||1774||
|-
|Anthony, Marquis of Litta and Gambolo||1700||1776||
|-
|Camille, Count of Colloredo||1712||1797||
|-
|Gabriel, Count of Bethlen||1729||1768||
|-
|Francis Norbert, Count of Trauttmansdorf||1705||1786||
|-
|rowspan=3| 1767||Charles Frederick, Count of Hatzfeld-Gleichen||1718||1793||
|-
|Johann Karl Walter, Count of Dietrichstein||1728||1808||later Prince of Dietrichstein
|-
|Charles Egon, Prince of Fürstenberg||1729||1787||
|-
|1768||Archduke Francis Joseph of Austria||1768||1835||later Emperor Francis II (Francis I of Austria). Head of the order from 1792
|-
|rowspan=2|1770||Claude, Count of Mercy-Argenteau||1727||1794||
|-
|Francis Maurice, Count of Lacy||1725||1801||
|-
|rowspan=5|1771||Archduke Joseph Ferdinand of Austria||1769||1824||later Grand Duke Ferdinand III of Tuscany
|-
|Franz, Count of Esterházy||?||1785||
|-
|Franz Josef I, Prince of Liechtenstein||1726||1781||
|-
|Franz Ulric, Count of Kinsky||1726||1792||
|-
|Charles, 2nd Duke d'Ursel||1718||1775||
|-
|rowspan=7|1772||Prince Karl Josef of Liechtenstein||1730||1789||
|-
|Karl Josef, Prince of Ligne||1735||1814||
|-
|Franz Gundakar, Count of Colloredo||1731||1807||
|-
|Ernst Christoph, Count of Kaunitz-Rietberg||1737||1797||
|-
|Maximilian, Prince of Salm-Salm and Duke of Hoogstraten||1732||1773||
|-
|Louis Frederick, Count of Zinzendorf et Pottendorf||1721||1783||
|-
|Josef, Prince of Lobkowicz and Duke of Sagan||1725||1802||
|-
|rowspan=2|1775||Bartolomeo, Prince of Corsini and Sismano||1729||1792||
|-
|Karl Anselm, 4th Prince of Thurn and Taxis||1733||1805||
|-
|1778||Charles Theodore, Elector of Bavaria||1724||1799||
|-
|rowspan=7|1782||Karl, Landgrave of Hesse-Rheinfels||1746||1812||
|-
|Johann, Prince of Schwarzenberg||1742||1789||
|-
|Louis Engelbert, 6th Duke of Arenberg||1750||1820||
|-
|Leopold Krakowsky, Count of Kolowrat||1727||180?||
|-
|Franz Wencel, Count of Sinzendorf and Thannhausen||1724||1792||
|-
|Eugen, Count of Wrbna-Freudenthal||1728||1789||
|-
|Karl, Count of Palffy ab Erdöd||1735||1816||
|-
|rowspan=6|1785||Johann Franz, Count of Khevenhüller-Metsch||1737||1797||
|-
|Antonius Gotthard, Count of Schaffgotsch||1721||1811||
|-
|Antonius, Count of Thurn and Valsassina||1723||1806||
|-
|Charles des Princes de Albani Savelli||1749||1811||
|-
|Francis Joseph, Prince of Gavre||1731||1797||
|-
|Johann, Count of Hardegg of Galtz and Machland||1741||1808||
|-
|1789||Ferdinand, Count of Trauttmansdorff-Weinsberg||1749||1827||
|-
|rowspan=17|1790||Francesco Maria Ruspoli, 3rd Prince of Cerveteri||1752||1829||
|-
|Anthony Clement of Saxony||1755||1836||later King of Saxony
|-
|Archduke Charles of Austria, Duke of Teschen||1771||1847||
|-
|Archduke Alexander Leopold of Austria||1772||1792||son of Emperor Leopold II
|-
|Archduke Joseph of Austria, Palatine of Hungary||1776||1848||
|-
|Archduke Francis of Austria||1779||1846||later Duke Francis IV of Modena
|-
|Karl Josef, Prince of Auersperg||1720||1800||
|-
|Alois I, Prince of Liechtenstein||1759||1805||
|-
|Antonius, Prince of Esterházy||1738||1794||
|-
|Alberic XII, Prince of Belgiojoso and Barbiano||1725||1813||
|-
|John, Baron of Hagen||?||?||
|-
|Eugen Erwin, Count of Shuönborn||1727||1801||
|-
|Chrisen, Count of Sternberg||1732||1798||
|-
|Antoine, Count of Karolyi||1732||1791||
|-
|Pompeo, Marquis of Litta Visconti Arese||1727||1797||
|-
|Frederick, Count of Nostitz||1728||1796||
|-
|Franz, Count of Colloredo||1736||1806||
|-
|rowspan=10|1792||Archduke Anthony of Austria||1779||1835||son of Emperor Leopold II. Grand Master of Teutonic Knights
|-
|Archduke John of Austria||1782||1859||
|-
|Philip, 14th Prince of Chimay||1736||1804||
|-
|August Josef, Prince of Lobkowicz||1724||1803||
|-
|Johann Josef, Count of Wilczek||1738||1819||
|-
|Dominikus, Count of Kaunitz-Rietberg-Questenberg||1739||1812||
|-
|Joseph, Count of Pallavicini-Centurion||1756||1818||
|-
|Charles Clement, Count of Pellegrini||1720||1796||
|-
|Franz Georg Karl, Count (later Prince) of Metternich||1746||1818||
|-
|Johann Philipp, Count of Cobenzl||1741||1810||
|-
|rowspan=2|1793||Archduke Ferdinand of Austria||1793||1857||later Emperor Ferdinand I of Austria (until 1848). Head of the Order from 1835 to 1848
|-
|Ludwig Eugen, Duke of Württemberg||1731||1795||
|-
|rowspan=2|1796||Francis Sebastian, Count of Clerfayt||1753||1798||
|-
|Karl, Prince of Auersperg||1750||1822||
|-
|rowspan=3|1798||Marzio Mastrilli, Duke of Gallo||1753||1833||
|-
|Ludwig, Count of Cobenzl||1753||1809||
|-
|Karl Alexander, 5th Prince of Thurn and Taxis||1770||1827||
|-

19th Century

!Year of Induction!!Name!!Born!!Died!!Notes
|-
|1802||Ludwig, Count of Starhemberg||1761||1833||later Prince of Starhemberg
|-
|rowspan=3|1803||Joseph, Prince Rospigliosi and Duke of Zagarolo||1755||1833||
|-
|Joachim Egon, Landgrave of Fürstenberg||1749||1828||
|-
||Franz, Count Esterházy of Galantha||1746||1811||son of Nicholas, Count of Esterházy (1711-1764)
|-
|rowspan=2|1805||Archduke Rainer Joseph of Austria||1783||1853||
|-
|Archduke Louis Joseph of Austria||1784||1864||
|-
|1806||Johann I Josef, Prince of Liechtenstein||1760||1836||
|-
|rowspan=17|1808||Archduke Ferdinand Karl Joseph of Austria-Este||1781||1850||
|-
|Karl, Count Zichy of Vasonykeo||1753||1826||
|-
|Nikolaus II, Prince Esterházy||1765||1833||
|-
|Johann Philipp, Count of Stadion-Thannhausen||1763||1824||
|-
|Rudolf, Count of Wrbna and Freudenthal||1761||1823||
|-
|Charles Eugene, Prince of Lambesc||1751||1825||
|-
|Adams Kasimir, Prince of Czartoryski||1734||1823||
|-
|Josef Johann, Prince of Schwarzenberg||1769||1835||
|-
|Johann Rudolf, Count Chotek of Chotkow and Wognin||1748||1824||
|-
|Prosper, Prince of Sinzendorf||1751||1822||
|-
|Immanuel, Count of Khevenhuller||1751||1847||
|-
|Josef, Count Erdödy||1754||1824||
|-
|Franz, Count Széchényi||1754||1820||
|-
|Phillipp Karl, Count of Oettingen-Wallerstein||1769||1826||
|-
|Francis, Prince of Orsini and Rosenberg||1761||1832||
|-
|Michael Francis, Count of Althan||1760||1817||Obersthofmeister of Empress Maria Ludovica
|-
|Stefan, Count of Illeshazy||1762||1838||
|-
|rowspan=2|1809||Karl, Prince of Schwarzenberg||1771||1820||
|-
|Franz Joseph, Prince of Lobkowicz||1772||1816||
|-
|rowspan=2|1810||Archduke Leopold Johann of Austria||1797||1870||later Grand Duke of Tuscany
|-
|Klemens Wenzel, Count (later Prince) of Metternich||1773||1859||
|-
|1811||Archduke Rudolph of Austria||1788||1831||later Cardinal and Archbishop of Olomouc
|-
|1813||Maximilian I, King of Bavaria||1756||1825||
|-
|1814||George Prince of Wales||1762||1830||Prince Regent of the United Kingdom. Later King George IV of the United Kingdom and Hanover
|-
|rowspan=7|1817||Louis, Count of Ugarte||1749||1817||
|-
|Archduke Franz Karl of Austria||1802||1878||
|-
|Henri, Count of Bellegarde||1760||1845||
|-
|Josef, Count of Wallis||1767||1818||
|-
|Josef, Count of Dietrichstein||1763||1825||
|-
|Antonius, Count of Brzezie-Lanckoronski||1748||1830||
|-
|Franz, Prince of Kohary||1766||1826||
|-
|1819||Frederick Augustus, Prince of Saxony||1797||1854||later King Frederick II Augustus of Saxony
|-
|1822||Charles Felix, King of Sardinia and Duke of Savoy||1765||1831||
|-
|rowspan=6|1823||Franz, Count of Saurau||1760||1832||
|-
|Henri, Count of Wurmbrand-Stuppach||1762||1847||Obersthofmeister of Empress Carolina Augusta
|-
|Vincent Liebsteinsky, Count of Kolowrat||1750||1824||
|-
|Charles Alain, Prince of Rohan and Duke of Bouillon (de la Marck | de La Marck | van de Marck) ||1764||1836||
|-
|||1756||1829||
|-
|Johann Rudolf, Count Czernin of Chudenitz||1757||1845||
|-
|rowspan=2|1825||Gilbert, Count of Borromeo Arese||1751||1837||
|-
|Ludwig I, King of Bavaria||1786||1868||
|-
|1826||Frederick Xavier, Prince of Hohenzollern-Hechingen||1757||1844||
|-
|rowspan=13|1830||Archduke Albert of Austria, Duke of Teschen||1817||1895||
|-
|Archduke Stefan of Austria||1817||1867||
|-
|Frederick Ferdinand, Duke of Anhalt-Köthen||1769||1830||
|-
|Karl, Prince of Löwenstein-Wertheim-Rosenberg||1783||1849||
|-
|Franz Liebsteinsky, Count of Kolowrat||1778||1861||
|-
|Rudolf, Prince of Colloredo-Mannsfeld||1772||1843||
|-
|Peter, Count of Goëss||1774||1846||
|-
|Alfonso Gabriel, Prince of Porcia||1861||1835||
|-
|Ignaz, Count of Gyulai||1763||1831||
|-
|Paul, Prince Esterházy of Galantha||1786||1866||
|-
|Louis, Prince of Liechtenstein||1780||1833||Jungest son of Prince Karl Borromäus of Liechtenstein
|-
|Louis, Count of Contarini||1766||1836||
|-
|Alfred, Prince of Windisch-Graetz||1787||1862||
|-
|rowspan=14|1836||Archduke Charles Ferdinand of Austria||1818||1874||
|-
|Archduke Francis of Austria-Este, Prince of Modena||1819||1875||later Duke Francis V of Modena
|-
|Antonius, Count of Mittrowsky of Mottrowitz and Nemischl||?||1842||
|-
|Ignaz, Count of Hardegg of Glatz and Machland||1772||1848||
|-
|Antonius, Count of Cziraky||1772||1852||
|-
|Antonius, Count of Apponyi||1782||1852||
|-
|Alois II, Prince of Liechtenstein||1796||1858||
|-
|Ferdinand, Prince of Lobkowicz||1797||1868||son of Joseph Franz von Lobkowitz
|-
|Adolf, Prince of Schwarzenberg||1799||1888||eldest son of Prince Josef Johann of Schwarzenberg
|-
|Karl Egon, Prince of Fürstenberg||1796||1854||
|-
|Frederick, Prince of Oettingen-Wallerstein||1793||1842||
|-
|Johann Ernst, Count of Hoyos-Sprinzenstein||1779||1849||
|-
|Maurice, Count of Dietrichstein-Proskau-Leslie||1775||1864||
|-
|Karl, Count Chotek of Chotkow and Wognin||1783||1868||
|-
|rowspan=4|1838||Charles Joseph Gallarati, Count of Scotti||1775||1840||
|-
|Geronimo, Count of Contarini||1770||1843||
|-
|Count Fidelius Pálffy of Erdöd||1788||1864||
|-
|Archduke Frederick Ferdinand of Austria||1821||1847||
|-
|rowspan=3|1841||Archduke Leopold Louis of Austria||1823||1898||son of Archduke Rainer of Austria
|-
|Maximilian Karl, 6th Prince of Thurn and Taxis||1802||1871||
|-
|Victor Emmanuel, Duke of Savoy||1820||1878||later King Victor Emmanuel II of Sardinia and Italy
|-
|rowspan=4|1844||Archduke Franz Josef of Austria||1830||1916||later Emperor Franz Josef of Austria and King of Hungary. Head of the order from 1848
|-
|Silvester, Count of Dandolo||1766||1847||
|-
|Archduke Ernst Karl of Austria||1824||1899||son of Archduke Rainer of Austria
|-
|Archduke Ferdinand Charles of Austria-Este||1821||1849||son of Duke Francis IV of Modena
|-
|1847||Vitalian, Count of Borromeo Arese||1792||1874||
|-
|rowspan=3|1849||Joseph, Count of Radetzky||1766||1858||
|-
|Maximilian II, King of Bavaria||1811||1864||
|-
|Luitpold, Prince of Bavaria||1821||1912||later Regent of Bavaria
|-
|rowspan=2|1850||Albert, Prince of Saxony||1828||1902||later King Albert I of Saxony
|-
|Otto, King of the Hellenes||1815||1867||
|-
|rowspan=18|1852||Archduke Ferdinand Maximilian of Austria||1832||1867||later Emperor Maximilian I of Mexico
|-
|Karl Ludwig, Archduke of Austria||1833||1896||
|-
||Ferdinand Salvator, Archduke of Austria||1835||1908||later Grand Duke Ferdinand IV of Tuscany
|-
|Joseph Charles, Archduke of Austria||1833||1905||son of Archduke Joseph, Palatine of Hungary
|-
|Sigismund, Archduke of Austria||1826||1891||son of Archduke Rainer of Austria
|-
|Archduke Rainier Ferdinand of Austria||1827||1913||son of Archduke Rainer of Austria
|-
|Heinrich, Archduke of Austria||1828||1891||son of Archduke Rainer of Austria
|-
|Karl, Prince of Liechtenstein||1790||1865||grandson of Prince Karl Borromäus of Liechtenstein
|-
|Hugo, Prince of Salm-Reifferscheid-Krautheim||1803||1888||
|-
|Karl II Prince of Schwarzenberg||1802||1858||
|-
|Philipp, Prince Batthyany||1781||1870||
|-
|Friedrich Egon, Landgrave of Fürstenberg||1774||1856||son of Joachim Egon zu Fürstenberg
|-
|Maximilian, Baron of Wimpffen||1770||1854||
|-
|Karl Ludwig Graf von Ficquelmont||1777||1857||
|-
|Eugen, Count of Wratislaw||1786||1867||
|-
|Karl, Count of Brzezie-Lanckoronski||1799||1863||
|-
|Ferdinand, Prince of Trauttmansdorff||1803||1856||
|-
|Karl Wilhelm, Prince of Auersperg||1814||1890||
|-
|rowspan=2|1853||Franz, Count of Gyulai||1798||1868||
|-
|Leopold, Crown Prince of Belgium and Duke of Brabant||1835||1909||later King Leopold II of the Belgians
|-
|rowspan=2|1854||Duke Maximilian Joseph in Bavaria||1808||1888||
|-
|Duke Ludwig Wilhelm in Bavaria||1831||1920||son of Duke Maximilian Joseph in Bavaria
|-
|1857||Count Joseph Archinto||1783||1861||
|-
|rowspan=2|1858||Laval, Count Nugent||1777||1862||
|-
|Archduke Rudolf of Austria, Crown Prince of Austria, Hungary and Bohemia||1858||1889||
|-
|1859||Prince Karl Theodor of Bavaria||1795||1875||
|-
|1860||Karl Anton, Prince of Hohenzollern||1811||1885||
|-
|rowspan=17|1862||Archduke Ludwig Victor of Austria||1842||1910||
|-
|Archduke Karl Salvator of Austria||1839||1892||son of Leopold II, Grand Duke of Tuscany
|-
|Prince George of Saxony||1832||1904||later King Georg I of Saxony
|-
|Duke Karl-Theodor in Bavaria||1839||1909||
|-
|Johannes II, Prince of Liechtenstein||1840||1929||
|-
|Prince August of Saxe-Coburg and Gotha||1818||1881||
|-
|Engelbert, 8th Duke of Arenberg||1824||1875||
|-
|Edmund, Prince of Schwarzenberg||1803||1873||
|-
|Maximilian Anton Lamoral, Hereditary Prince of Thurn and Taxis||1831||1867||
|-
|Nicholas III, Prince Esterhazy||1817||1884||
|-
|Charles, Prince of Paar||1806||1881||
|-
|Antal Károly, Prince Pálffy of Erdöd||1793||1879||
|-
|Franz, Count of Kuefstein||1794||1871||
|-
|Franz Ernst, Count of Harrach||1799||1884||
|-
|Franz, Count of Hartig||1789||1865||
|-
|Johann, Count of Coronini-Cronberg||1794||1880||
|-
|Edward, Count of Clam-Gallas||1805||1891||
|-
|rowspan=2|1864||Ludwig II, King of Bavaria||1845||1886||
|-
|Johann Bernard, Count of Rechberg and Rothenlöwen||1806||1890||
|-
|rowspan=9|1865||Philip, Duke of Württemberg||1838||1917||
|-
|Karl Egon, Prince of Fürstenberg||1820||1892||
|-
|Edward, Prince of Schönburg-Hartenstein||1787||1872||
|-
|Vincent, Prince of Auersperg and Duke of Gotschée||1812||1867||
|-
|Camille, Prince of Rohan and Duke of Bouillon||1800||1892||
|-
|Franz Séraphin, Count of Nadasdy||1801||1883||
|-
|Karl, Count of Grunne||1802||1858||
|-
|Philipp, Prince Batthyany||1808||1884||
|-
|Rudolf, Count of Apponyi||1812||1875||
|-
|rowspan=13|1867||Constantine, Prince of Hohenlohe-Schillingsfürst||1828||1896||
|-
|Maximilian Egon I, Prince of Fürstenberg||?||1873||
|-
|Emerich, Count of Batthyany||1781||1874||
|-
|Antonius, Count of Majlath||1801||?||
|-
|Johann, Count of Cziraky||1818||1884||
|-
|Archduke Ludwig Salvator of Austria||1847||1915||son of Leopold II, Grand Duke of Tuscany
|-
|Charles, Prince of Isenburg-Birstein||1838||1899||
|-
|Prince Friedrich of Liechtenstein||1807||1885||son of Johann I Josef, Prince of Liechtenstein
|-
|Alfred II, Prince of Windisch-Graetz||1819||1876||
|-
|Richard, Prince of Metternich-Winneburg||1829||1895||
|-
|William Albert, 1st Prince of Montenuovo||1821||1879||
|-
|Ernst, Count of Waldstein-Wartenberg||1821||1904||
|-
|Count Franz Folliot de Crenneville-Poutet||1815||1888||
|-
|rowspan=2|1868||Prince Ludwig of Bavaria||1845||1921||later King Ludwig III of Bavaria
|-
|Prince Leopold of Bavaria||1846||1930||
|-
|rowspan=7|1869||Umberto, Crown Prince of Italy||1844||1900||later King Umberto I of Italy
|-
|Prince Otto of Bavaria||1848||1916||later King Otto of Bavaria
|-
|Franz, Count of Meran||1839||1891||
|-
|Johann, Landgrave of Fürstenberg||1802||1879||
|-
|Alfred, Count of Potocki||1817||1889||
|-
|Tassilo, Count Festétics of Tólna||1813||1883||
|-
|Franz, Count of Haller of Halerkeö||1795||1875||
|-
|rowspan=7|1873||Archduke Friedrich of Austria, Duke of Teschen||1856||1936||
|-
|Prince Arnulf of Bavaria||1852||1907||son of Luitpold, Prince Regent of Bavaria
|-
|Josef, Prince of Colloredo-Mannsfeld||1813||1895||
|-
|Richard, Prince of Khevenhüller||1813||1877||
|-
|Erwin, Count of Neipperg||1813||1897||
|-
|Johann, Count of Larisch-Mönnich||1821||1884||
|-
|Ferdinand, Prince Kinsky||1834||1904||
|-
|1875||Duke Maximilian Emmanuel in Bavaria||1849||1893||son of Duke Maximilian Joseph in Bavaria
|-
|1877||Julius, Count of Andrassy||1823||1890||
|-
|rowspan=16|1878||Archduke Franz Ferdinand of Austria||1863||1914||later heir presumptive to the Austro-Hungarian throne
|-
|Archduke Leopold Salvator of Austria||1863||1931||son of Archduke Karl Salvator of Austria
|-
|Archduke Karl of Austria||1860||1933||
|-
|Archduke Eugen of Austria||1863||1954||
|-
|Maurice, Count Esterházy||1807||1890||
|-
|Antonius, Count of Goëß||1816||1887||
|-
|Rudolf, Count of Wrbna and Freudenthal||1818||1883||
|-
|Georg von Majlath||1818||1883||later Count of Majlath
|-
|Emeric, Prince of Thurn and Taxis||1820||1900||from the Czech branch of the House of Thurn and Taxis
|-
|Prince Adolf Wilhelm Daniel von Auersperg||1821||1885||
|-
|Richard, Count of Belcredi||1823||1902||
|-
|Rodolph, Duke of Croÿ||1823||1902||
|-
|Ferdinand, Count of Trauttmansdorff-Weinsberg||1825||1896||
|-
|Louis, Count Karolyi of Nagy-Karoly||1825||1889||
|-
|Joseph Alexander, Prince of Schönburg-Hartenstein||1826||1896||
|-
|Eduard Taaffe, 11th Viscount Taaffe||1833||1895||
|-
|rowspan=9|1881||Archduke Otto of Austria||1865||1906||
|-
|Miguel, Duke of Braganza||1853||1927||
|-
|Prince Philip of Saxe-Coburg and Gotha||1844||1921||
|-
|Peter, Count of Pejacsevich||1804||1887||
|-
||Karl III, Prince of Schwarzenberg||1824||1904||
|-
|Hugo, Count of Abensperg-Traun||1828||1904||
|-
|Maurice, Prince of Lobkowicz||1831||1903||
|-
|Julius, Count of Szapary||1832||1905||
|-
|Charles, 6th Prince of Löwenstein-Wertheim-Rosenberg||1834||1921||
|-
|rowspan=10|1884||Charles I, King of Romania||1839||1914||
|-
|Archduke Ferdinand Charles of Austria||1868||1915||son of Archduke Karl Ludwig of Austria
|-
|Archduke Leopold Ferdinand of Austria||1868||1935||removed from the roll of the order, 1902
|-
|Archduke Franz Salvator of Austria||1866||1939||son of Archduke Karl Salvator of Austria
|-
|Ladislaus de Szögyény-Marich||1841||1916||
|-
|Leopold, Count of Thun and Hohenstein||1811||1888||
|-
|Jaromir, Count Czernin of Chudenitz||1818||1908||
|-
|Karl, Prince of Khevenhüller-Metsch||1839||1905||
|-
|Alfred III, Prince of Windisch-Grätz||1851||1927||
|-
|Maximilian Maria, Prince of Thurn and Taxis||1862||1885||
|-
|rowspan=6|1887||Antonius, Count of Szecsen of Temerin||1819||1896||
|-
|Arthur, Count of Bylandt-Rheidt||1821||1891||
|-
|Paul, Baron Sennyey of Kis-Sennye||1824||1888||
|-
|Ludwig, Prince of Windisch-Graetz||1830||1904||
|-
|Gustav, Count Kalnoky of Köröspatak||1832||1898||
|-
|Nicholas, Count Pejascevich of Veröcze||1833||1890||
|-
|rowspan=11|1889||Prince Frederick Augustus of Saxony||1865||1932||later King Frederick Augustus III of Saxony
|-
|Archduke Albert Salvator of Austria||1871||1896||son of Archduke Karl Salvator of Austria
|-
|Baron Lajos Jósika de Branyicska||1807||1891||
|-
|Count Moritz Pálffy of Erdöd||1812||1897||
|-
|Stephen, Count of Erdödy||1813||1896||
|-
|Victor, Prince of Hohenlohe||1818||1893||
|-
|Antonius, Count of Wolkenstein-Trotsbourg||1832||1913||
|-
|Ernst, Count of Hoyos-Sprinzenstein||1830||1903||
|-
|Adolf Josef, Prince of Schwarzenberg||1832||1914||
|-
|Julius, Count Karolyi of Nagy-Karoly||1837||1890||
|-
|Albert, 8th Prince of Thurn and Taxis||1867||1952||
|-
|rowspan=6|1891||Archduke Josef Ferdinand of Austria||1872||1942||
|-
|Archduke Joseph August of Austria||1872||1962||
|-
|Leopold, Count of Sternberg||1811||1899||
|-
|Edmond, Prince of Clary and Aldringen||1813||1894||
|-
|Richard, Count of Clam-Martinic||1832||1891||
|-
|Count Karoly Khuen-Belasi-Héderváry||1849||1918||
|-
|rowspan=9|1892||Emeric, Count Széchényi of Sárvár-Felsővidék||1825||1898||
|-
|Emil Egon, Prince of Fürstenberg||1825||1899||
|-
|Leopold, Prince of Croy-Dulmen||1827||1894||
|-
|Franz, Count of Falkenhayn||1827||1898||
|-
|Ferdinand, Count of Zichy of Zich and Väsonykeö||1829||1911||
|-
|Count Philipp of Grunne||1833||1902||
|-
|Prince Rudolf of Liechtenstein||1838||1908||
|-
|Rudolf, Prince of Lobkowicz||1840||1908||
|-
|Karl Friedrich, Prince of Oettingen-Wallerstein||1840||1905||
|-
|rowspan=2|1893||Albrecht, Duke of Württemberg||1865||1939||
|-
|Archduke Peter Ferdinand of Austria||1874||1948||son of Ferdinand IV, Grand Duke of Tuscany
|-
|1895||Archduke Ladislaus of Austria||1875||1895||son of Archduke Joseph Karl of Austria
|-
|rowspan=11|1896||Aladar, Count of Andrassy||1827||1903||
|-
|Johann, Count of Harrach||1828||1909||
|-
|Adam, Prince Sapieha-Kodenski||1828||1903||
|-
|Karl, Prince of Paar||1834||1917||
|-
|Count Zeno Welser of Welsersheimb||1835||1921||
|-
|Paul IV, Prince Esterházy of Galantha||1843||1898||
|-
|Franz, Count of Thun-Hohenstein||1847||1916||later Prince of Thun and Hohenstein
|-
|Tassilo, Count Festétics of Tólna||1850||1933||later Prince Festétics of Tólna
|-
|Clovis, Prince of Hohenlohe-Schillingsfürst||1819||1901||
|-
|Agenor, Count of Goluchowski of Goluchowo||1849||1921||
|-
|Philippe, Duke of Orléans||1869||1926||
|-
|1897||Archduke Heinrich Ferdinand of Austria||1878||1969||son of Ferdinand IV, Grand Duke of Tuscany
|-
|rowspan=2|1898||Eustach, Prince of Sanguszko-Lubartowicz||1842||1903||
|-
|Prince Johann Georg of Saxony||1869||1938||son of King George of Saxony
|-
|1899||Emanuele Filiberto, 2nd Duke of Aosta||1869||1931||
|-
|rowspan=15|1900||Prince Rupprecht of Bavaria||1869||1955||later Crown Prince of Bavaria
|-
|Prince Georg of Bavaria||1880||1943||
|-
|William, Count of Siemienski-Lewicki||1827||1901||
|-
|Karl, Prince of Fugger-Babenhausen||1861||1925||
|-
|Alexander, Count of Karolyi||1831||1906||
|-
|Edward, Count of Paar||1837||1919||
|-
|Franz, Count of Deym||1838||1903||
|-
|Ladislaus de Szögyény-Marich||1841||1916||
|-
|Josef, Count of Thun-Hohenstein-Salm-Reifferscheidt||1849||1913||
|-
|Bela, Count of Cziraky||1852||1911||
|-
|Alfred, 2nd Prince of Montenuovo||1854||1927||
|-
|Karl, Prince of Auersperg||1859||1927||
|-
|Nicholas, Prince of Palffy||1861||1955||
|-
|Maximilian Egon II, Prince of Fürstenberg||1863||1941||
|-
|Robert, Duke of Württemberg||1873||1947||

20th Century

!Year of Induction!!Name!!Born!!Died!!Notes
|-
|rowspan=7|1903||Prince Alfred of Liechtenstein||1842||1907||
|-
|Count Gyula Széchényi de Sárvár-Felsövidék||1829||1921||
|-
|Georg Christian, Prince of Lobkowicz||1835||1908||
|-
|Count Karl of Brzezie-Lanckoronski||1848||1933||
|-
|Margrave Alexander of Pallavicini||1853||1933||
|-
|Alois, Prince of Schönburg-Hartenstein||1858||1944||
|-
|Miklós, Prince Esterházy of Galántha||1869||1920||
|-
|1905||Archduke Charles of Austria||1887||1922||later Emperor Charles I of Austria, King Charles IV of Hungary and III of Bohemia. Head of the order from 1916 until 1922
|-
|rowspan=15|1907||Wilhelm, Prince of Hohenzollern||1864||1927||
|-
|Prince Albert of Belgium||1874||1934||later King Albert I of the Belgians
|-
|Elias, Duke of Parma||1880||1959||Head of the Ducal House of Parma
|-
|Prince Konrad of Bavaria||1883||1969||son of Prince Leopold of Bavaria
|-
|Count Albin Csaky de Körösszeg et Adorján||1841||1912||
|-
|Count Sándor Apponyi de Nagy-Apponyi||1844||1925||
|-
|Karl, Prince of Trauttmansdorff-Weinsberg||1845||1921||
|-
|Franz Josef, Prince of Auersperg||1856||1938||
|-
|Karl, Prince Kinsky of Wchinitz and Tettau||1858||1919||
|-
|Hugo, Prince of Dietrichstein of Nikolsbourg||1858||1920||
|-
|Karl, Prince of Schwarzenberg||1859||1913||
|-
|Count Andreas Potocki||1861||1927||
|-
|Ernst Rüdiger, Prince of Starhemberg||1861||1927||
|-
|Johann, Prince of Hohenlohe-Bartenstein||1863||1921||
|-
|Count Johann of Meran||1867||1947||
|-
|rowspan=8|1908||Ernst, Prince of Windisch-Graetz||1827||1918||
|-
|Count Ladislaus Pejácsevich de Veröcze||1828||1916||
|-
|Prince Alajos Esterházy of Galántha||1844||1912||
|-
|Count Rudolf of Khevenhuller-Metsch||1844||1910||
|-
|Alain, Prince of Rohan||1853||1914||
|-
|Count Roman Potocki||1852||1915||
|-
|Miklós, Count Szécsen de Temerin||1857||1926||
|-
|Ferdinand, Prince of Lobkowicz||1858||1938||
|-
|1909||Ferdinand, Crown Prince of Romania||1865||1927||later King Ferdinand I of Romania
|-
|1910||Archduke Karl Albrecht of Austria||1888||1951||
|-
|rowspan=6|1911||Ferdinand I, King of Bulgaria||1861||1948||
|-
|Prince Alois of Liechtenstein||1869||1955||
|-
|Count Rudolph of Montecuccoli||1843||1922||
|-
|Count Leopold of Gudenus||1843||1913||
|-
|Count Antonius of Cziraki||1850||?||
|-
|Count Eugen Czernin of Chudenitz||1851||1925||
|-
|rowspan=2|1912||Karl de Longueval, Count of Buquoy||1854||1911||
|-
|Leopold, Count Berchtold von und zu Ungarschitz, Frättling und Püllütz||1863||1942||
|-
|1913||Ferdinand, Prince of Lobkowicz||1850||1938||
|-
|1914||Friedrich August Georg, Crown Prince of Saxony||1893||1943||son of King Frederick Augustus III of Saxony
|-
|rowspan=9|1915||Archduke Maximilian Eugen of Austria||1895||1952||
|-
|Archduke Franz Karl Salvator of Austria||1893||1918||son of Archduke Franz Salvator of Austria
|-
|Archduke Hubert Salvator of Austria||1894||1971||
|-
|Archduke Leon Karl of Austria||1893||1939||
|-
|Archduke Wilhelm Franz of Austria||1895||1954||
|-
|Archduke Joseph Franz of Austria||1895||1957||
|-
|Count Augustus Zichy de Zich et Vásonkeö||1852||1925||
|-
|Johann, Prince of Schwarzenberg||1860||1938||
|-
|Count Ferdinand Kinsky of Wchinitz and Tettau||1886||1916||
|-
|rowspan=8|1916||Archduke Albert Franz of Austria||1897||1955||
|-
|Archduke Ranier Karl of Austria||1895||1930||
|-
|Archduke Leopold of Austria||1897||1958||
|-
|Archduke Otto of Austria, Crown Prince of Austria, Hungary and Bohemia||1912||2011||Head of the House of Habsburg and Sovereign of the Order of the Golden Fleece from 1922 to 2007
|-
|Count Aurel Dessewffy de Csernek et Tarkeö||1846||1928||
|-
|Baron Samuel Josika||1848||1923||
|-
|Gyula, Count Andrássy de Csíkszentkirály et Krasznahorka||1860||1929||
|-
|Ladislaus, Prince of Batthyany-Strattmann||1870||1931||
|-
|rowspan=7|1917||Philipp Albrecht, Duke of Württemberg||1893||1975 ||later Head of the Royal House of Württemberg
|-
|Franz I, Prince of Liechtenstein||1853||1938||
|-
|Count Johann Nepomuk of Wilczek||1837||1922||
|-
|Konrad, Prince of Hohenlohe-Schillingsfürst||1863||1918||
|-
|Friedrich Karl, Count of Schönborn-Bucheim||1869||1932||
|-
|Gottfried, Prince of Hohenlohe-Schillingsfürst||1867||1932||
|-
|Ottokar, Count Czernin von und zu Chudenitz||1872||1932||
|-
|rowspan=6|1918||Count Miklós Móric Esterházy of Galántha||1855||1925||
|-
|Zdenko Vincent, Prince of Lobkowicz||1858||1933||
|-
|Count Heinrich of Clam-Martinic||1863||1932||
|-
|Count Karl of Kuefstein||1838||1925||
|-
|Count Joseph of Hunyady||1873||1942||
|-
|Stephan, Count Burián von Rajecz||1851||1922||
|-
|rowspan=2|1919||Count Georg of Wallis||1856||1928||
|-
|Count Nikolaus Revertera of Salandra||1860||1951||
|-
|rowspan=2|1920||Prince Johann of Schönburg-Hartenstein||1864||1937||
|-
|Karl Emil, Prince of Furstenberg||1867||1945||
|-
|rowspan=3|1921||Prince Johann of Liechtenstein||1873||1959||
|-
|Albert, Count Apponyi de Nagy-Appony||1846||1933||
|-
|Count Alexander Esterházy of Galántha||1868||1925||
|-
|rowspan=7|1932||Archduke Robert of Austria-Este||1915||1996||
|-
|Archduke Gottfried of Austria||1902||1984||Head of the Grand Ducal House of Tuscany
|-
|Maximilian, Duke of Hohenberg||1902||1962||
|-
|Baron Erwein of Gudenus||1869||1953||
|-
|Count Heinrich of Degenfeld-Schonburg||1890||1978||
|-
|Count Joseph Karolyi of Nagy-Karoly||1884||1934||
|-
|Count Joseph Cziraki of Czirak and Dénesfalva||1883||1960||
|-
|rowspan=2|1934||Archduke Georg of Austria||1905||1952||son of Archduke Peter Ferdinand of Austria
|-
|Count Johann Zichy||1868||1944||
|-
|rowspan=5|1945||Archduke Felix of Austria||1916||2011||son of Emperor Charles I of Austria (King Charles VI of Hungary and III of Bohemia)
|-
|Archduke Carl Ludwig of Austria||1918||2007||son of Emperor Charles I of Austria (King Charles VI of Hungary and III of Bohemia)
|-
|Archduke Rudolf Syringus of Austria||1919||2010||son of Emperor Charles I of Austria (King Charles VI of Hungary and III of Bohemia)
|-
|Prince Ernst of Hohenberg||1904||1954||
|-
|Count Antonius of Sigray||1879||1947||
|-
|rowspan=2|1946||Margrave Georg of Pallavicini||1881||1946||
|-
|Leopold, Count Künigl||1880||1965||
|-
|rowspan=4|1948||Duarte Nuno, Duke of Braganza||1907||1976||Head of the Royal House of Portugal
|-
|Franz Joseph II, Prince of Liechtenstein||1906||1989||
|-
|Archduke Theodor Salvator of Austria||1899||1978||son of Archduke Franz Salvator of Austria
|-
|Count Ferdinand of Colloredo-Mannsfeld||1878||1967||
|-
|1949||Baron Franz of Vorst-Gudenau-Mirbach||1878||1952||
|-
|rowspan=6|1950||Friedrich Christian, Margrave of Meissen||1893||1968||Head of the Royal House of Saxony
|-
|Friedrich, Prince of Hohenzollern-Sigmaringen||1891||1965||
|-
|Count Georg of Waldburg-Zeil-Hohenems||1878||1955||
|-
|Count Bernhard of Stolberg-Stolberg||1881||1952||
|-
|Margrave Alphons of Pallavicini||1883||1958||
|-
|Count Rudolf of Straten-Ponthoz||1877||1961||
|-
|rowspan=6|1951||Archduke Ferdinand of Austria||1918||2004||son of Archduke Maximilian Eugen of Austria. Nephew of Emperor Charles I of Austria
|-
|Prince Heinrich of Liechtenstein||1916||1991||
|-
|Joseph, Prince of Schwarzenberg||1900||1979||
|-
|Erich, Prince of Waldburg-Zeil and Trauchburg||1899||1953||
|-
|José de Saldanha da Gama||1893||1958||
|-
|Baron Gábor Apor de Al-Torja||1889||1969||
|-
|rowspan=7|1953||Albrecht, Hereditary Prince of Bavaria||1905||1996||later Duke of Bavaria and Head of the Royal House of Bavaria
|-
|Ladislaus, Prince of Batthyany-Strattmann||1904||1966||
|-
|Eduard, Prince of Auersperg||1863||1956||
|-
|Count Karl of Trauttmansdorff-Weinsberg||1897||1970||
|-
|Count Carl of Czernin of Chudenitz||1886||1978||
|-
|Count János Esterházy de Galántha||1900||1967||
|-
|Count Philipp of Gudenus||1905||1990||
|-
|rowspan=3|1954||Eugène, 11th Prince of Ligne||1893||1960||
|-
|Count Franz Josef Forni||1904||1992||
|-
|Viscount Charles Terlinden||1878||1972||
|-
|rowspan=4|1955||Archduke Heinrich of Austria||1925||2014 ||son of Archduke Maximilian Eugen of Austria
|-
|Count Thierry de Limburg Stirum||1904||1968||
|-
|Count Charles de Limburg Stirum||1906||1989||
|-
|Gaston Christyn, Count of Ribaucourt||1882||1961||
|-
|rowspan=3|1957||Count Rudolf Hoyos-Sprinzenstein||1884||1972  ||
|-
|Count Peter Revertera of Salandra||1893||1966||
|-
|Count Franz of Meran||1891||1983||
|-
|rowspan=2|1958||Archduke Friedrich Salvator of Austria||1927||1999||son of Archduke Hubert Salvator of Austria
|-
|Archduke Franz Salvator of Austria||1927||2012||
|-
|rowspan=8|1960||Archduke Joseph Árpád of Austria||1933||2017||
|-
|Franz, Hereditary Prince of Bavaria||1933||- ||later Duke of Bavaria and Head of the Royal House of Bavaria
|-
|Prince Ludwig of Bavaria||1913||2008||
|-
|Karl, 8th Prince of Löwenstein-Wertheim-Rosenberg||1904||1990||
|-
|Karl, Prince of Schwarzenberg||1911||1986  ||
|-
|Count Johann-Anton of Goëss||1892||1970||
|-
|Count Adalbert Hadik de Futak||1905||1971||
|-
|Count Johann Larisch of Moennich||1917||1997||
|-
|rowspan=1|1961||Archduke Karl of Austria||1961||- ||Head of the House of Habsburg and Sovereign of the Order of the Golden Fleece since 2007
|-
|rowspan=5|1962||Archduke Anton of Austria||1901||1987|| Son of Archduke Leopold Salvator of Austria
|-
|Engelbert von Croÿ||1891||1974|| Son of Karl Herzog von Croy
|-
|Franz Anton von Thun und Hohenstein||1890||1973|| Nephew of Franz von Thun und Hohenstein
|-
|Amédée Comte d’Andigné||1900||1993||
|-
|Prince Albert II of Belgium||1937|| - ||Monarch between 1993 and 2013
|-
|rowspan=8|1972||Jean, Grand Duke of Luxembourg||1921|| 2019 ||Monarch until 2000
|-
|Angelo de Mojana di Cologna||1905||1988|| 77th Grand Master of the Knights Hospitaller
|-
|Archduke Andreas Salvator of Austria, Prince of Tuscany||1936|| - ||son of Archduke Hubert Salvator of Austria
|-
|Archduke Karl Salvator of Austria, Prince of Tuscany||1936|| - ||son of Archduke Theodore Salvator of Austria (born 1899)
|-
|Karl August, 10th Prince of Thurn and Taxis||1898||1982|| Head of the House Thurn und Taxis (1971–1982)
|-
|Amaury de Merode||1902||1980|| President of the FIA (1971–1975)
|-
|Antoine, Prince of Ligne||1925||2005||
|-
|Raymond, Viscount of Chabot-Tramecourt||1924||2012||
|-
|rowspan=2|1973||Archduke Clemens Salvator of Austria-Tuscany||1904|| 1974 ||Son of Archduke Franz Salvator of Austria
|-
|Prince Albrecht of Hohenberg||1931||2021||
|-
|rowspan=1|1974||Joachim Egon, Prince of Fürstenberg||1923||2002||
|-
|rowspan=3|1975||Prince Rasso of Bavaria||1926||2011||
|-
|Carl, Duke of Württemberg||1936||2022||Head of the Royal House of Württemberg
|-
|Alain de Rohan, Prince of Rohan||1893||1976|| Son of Alain de Rohan (born 1853)
|-
|rowspan=1|1976||Eduard, Prince of Auersperg-Trautson||1917||2002||
|-
|rowspan=3|1977||Archduke Lorenz of Austria-Este, Prince of Belgium||1955|| - ||
|-
|Prince Vincenz of Liechtenstein||1950||2008||
|-
| Ernst von Thun und Hohenstein||1905||1985|| Brother of Franz Anton von Thun und Hohenstein
|-
|rowspan=3|1978||Maria Emanuel, Margrave of Meissen||1926||2012 ||Head of the Royal House of Saxony
|-
|Nikolaus, Prince of Lobkowicz||1931|| 2019 ||
|-
|Count Johann of Hoyos-Sprinzenstein||1923||2010||
|-
|rowspan=3|1980||Archduke Michael Salvator of Austria, Prince of Tuscany||1949|| - ||son of Archduke Hubert Salvator of Austria
|-
|Archduke Michael Koloman of Austria||1942|| - ||son of Archduke Joseph Francis of Austria
|-
|Georg, Prince of Waldburg-Zeil and Trauchberg||1928||2015||
|-
|rowspan=14|1981–1994||Hans-Adam II, Prince of Liechtenstein||1945|| - ||
|-
|Prince Clemens of Altenburg||1932||2022||
|-
|Duarte Pio, Duke of Braganza||1945|| - ||Head of the Royal House of Portugal
|-
|Count Joseph of Neipperg||1918||2020||
|-
|Georg, Duke of Hohenberg||1929|| 2019 ||
|-
|Charles Emile Comte d’Oultremont||1915||1993||
|-
|Archduke Georg of Austria||1964|| - ||
|-
|Georg, Graf von Nostitz-Rieneck||1904||1992||
|-
|Archduke Carl Christian of Austria||1954|| - ||
|-
|Karl Johannes, Prince of Schwarzenberg||1937|| - ||
|-
|Archduke Joseph of Austria||1960||- ||son of Archduke Joseph Árpád of Austria
|-
|Fra Andrew Bertie, Grand Master of the Order of Malta||1929|| 2008 ||
|-
|Count Jakob of Eltz||1921|| 2006 ||
|-
|Max, Prince of Khevenhüller-Metsch||1919||2010||
|-
|rowspan=3|1996||Aloys-Konstantin, Prince of Löwenstein-Wertheim-Rosenberg||1941|| -  ||
|-
|Count Gottfried of Czernin of Chudenitz||1927|| 2002 ||
|-
|Gottfried Graf von Degenfeld-Schönburg||1925||2005||
|-
|rowspan=5|2000||Heinrich, Prince of Orsini and Rosenberg||1925|| 2011 ||
|-
|Mariano Hugo, Prince of Windisch-Grätz||1955|| - ||
|-
|Olivier, Count of Ormesson||1918|| 2012 ||
|-
|Baron Johann Friedrich of Solemacher-Antweiler||1945|| - ||
|-
|Baron Nicolas Adamovich de Csepin||1936|| 2017 ||
|-

21st Century

!Year of Induction!!Name!!Born!!Died!!Notes
|-
|rowspan="3"|2001||Friedrich, Duke of Württemberg||1961||2018||Son of Carl, Duke of Württemberg
|-
|Georg Adam Starhemberg||1961|| ||Since 1997 Head of the House of Starhemberg
|-
|Bernard Guerrier de Dumast||1932||2019||
|-
|rowspan="2"|2002||Alexander Schönburg-Hartenstein||1930||2018||Since 1992 Head of the House of Schönburg-Hartenstein
|-
|Kubrat, Prince of Panagyurishte and Duke of Saxony||1965|| ||3rd Son of Tsar Simeon II of Bulgaria
|-
|2004||Friedrich Mayr-Melnhof||1924|| 2020||
|-
|2006||Henri, Grand Duke of Luxembourg||1955|| ||Son of Jean
|-
|2008||Prince Philippe, Duke of Brabant||1960|| - || later King Philippe of the Belgians. Mentioned in his biography in the "Biographical Manual" (2007), an official publication of the Belgian Senate
|-
|rowspan=14|2011||Michel, 14th Prince of Ligne||1951||-||
|-
||Prince Charles-Louis de Merode||1948||-||
|-
||Ferdinand Zvonimir von Habsburg||1997||- ||son and heir of Archduke Karl of Austria, Head of the House of Habsburg and Sovereign of the Order
|-
|Prince Michael of Liechtenstein||1951||-||
|-
||Fra' Robert Matthew Festing, 79th Prince and Grand Master of the Order of Malta||1949||2021||Monarch until 2017
|-
|Maximilian Turnauer||1930||2020||
|-
|Peter Seilern-Aspang||1952||-||
|-
|Alexander von Sachsen, Margrave of Meissen||1953||-||
|-
|Dominic of Austria-Tuscany||1937||-||son of Archduke Anton of Austria-Tuscany
|-
|Ferdinand Trauttmansdorff-Weinsberg||1950||-||Austrian ambassador in Prague
|-
|Prospero Colonna, Prince of Avella||1956||-||
|-
|Prince Nikolaus of Liechtenstein||1947||-||son of Franz Joseph II, Prince of Liechtenstein
|-
|Georg von Károlyi||1946||-||
|-
|Victor Freiherr von Baillou||1931||-||son-in-law of Archduke Anton of Austria-Tuscany since 1973 
|-
|rowspan=3|2016
|Eduard of Habsburg-Lorraine||1967||-||great-grandson of Archduke Joseph August of Austria
|-
|Emanuel Salm-Salm||1961||-||
|-
|Johannes Trapp von Matsch||1946||-||

Rival branches

Knights of the Josephine branch of the Spanish Golden Fleece (1809–1813) 

!Year of Induction!!Name!!Born!!Died!!Notes
|-
|1809||Jérôme Bonaparte, king of Westphalia||1784||1860||
|-
|rowspan=2|1810||Miguel José de Azanza, 1st Duke (Josephine) of Santa Fe||1744||1826||Viceroy of New Spain (1798–1800)
|-
||||1736||1818||
|-
|1811||José de Mazarredo Salazar Muñatones y Gortázar||1745||1812|| Lieutenant General of the Royal Spanish Navy
|-
|rowspan=2|1812||Gonzalo O'Farrill y Herrera||1754||1831||
|-
||Mariano Luis de Urquijo y Murga||1769||1817|| Secretary of State (1798–1800). Minister-Secretary of State (1808–1813)
|-
|}

Knights of the Carlist branch of the Spanish Golden Fleece (1836–1931) 

!Year of Induction!!Name!!Born!!Died!!Notes
|-
|rowspan=2|ca. 1836||Joaquín Abarca y Blanque, bishop of León||1778||1844||
|-
|Manuel María de Medina Cabañas y Verdes Montenegro, 1st Count (Carlist) of Casa Medina||1773||1856||
|-
|ca. 1838||Miguel Gómez y Damas, 1st Marquess (Carlist) of Orbaiceta||1796||1849||
|-
|ca. 1850||Infante Alfonso Carlos, Duke of San Jaime||1849||1936||Grandson of Carlos María Isidro, 1st Carlist Pretender. Futur 6th Carlist Pretender as Alfonso Carlos 1st.
|-
|ca. 1870||Ramón Cabrera y Griñó, 1st Count (Carlista) of Morella, 1st Marquess (Carlist) of El Ter and 1st Duke (Carlist) of El Maestrazgo ||1806||1877||
|-
|rowspan=3|ca. 1875||Hermenegildo Díaz de Cevallos, 1st Count (Carlist) of Vinculo, 1st Marquess (Carlist) of Cevallos||1814||1891||
|-
||Joaquín de Elío y Ezpeleta, 1st Marquess (Carlist) of La Lealtad and 1st I Duke (Carlist) of Elío||1806||1876||
|-
||Pedro Caro y Álvarez de Toledo, 5th Marquess of La Romana and 1st Count (Carlist) of La Real Estimación||1827||1890||
|-
|ca. 1895||Enrique de Aguilera y Gamboa, 17th Marquess of Cerralbo, 11th Count of La Alcudia||1845||1922||
|-
|ca. 1900|||Tirso de Olazábal y Lardizábal, 1st Count of Arbelaiz, 1st Count of Oria||1842||1921||
|-
|}

Carloctaviste branch 

On 29 June 1943 Archduke Karl Pius of Austria, Prince of Tuscany issued a manifesto in which he claimed to be the legitimate successor to the Spanish throne. At the time, he had three older brothers still living, but none of these had shown an interest in claiming the throne for himself. In 1947 Karl's older brothers Leopold and Franz Josef formally renounced their rights in New York. In 1948 his other brother Anton verbally renounced his rights in Barcelona. (Both Anton and Franz Josef would take up the claim after Karl died, and Anton's son Dominic is the current claimant.)

Karl was recognised by his supporters as Carlos VIII; his movement is therefore called carloctavismo or octavismo. He used the title Duke of Madrid as his grandfather had done. Karl received the support of some of the most conservative Carlist leaders. He also received a certain level of support from some of General Franco's officials in the Movimiento Nacional; the followers of the Carlist regent Prince Xavier of Bourbon-Parma claimed that the Francoist support was merely an attempt to divide Carlists.
Karl moved to Andorra and then returned to Barcelona. Between 1944 and 1951 he gave out fourteen titles of nobility; he also named members to the Order of Proscribed Legitimacy and the Order of Santa Maria of the Lily of Navarre. He established a new order of merit named in honour of Saint Charles Borromeo. In 1952 he awarded the collar of this order to General Franco and the grand cross of the order to Cardinal Federico Tedeschini, papal legate to the International Eucharistic Congress in Barcelona.

Since Karl claimed to be the legitimate successor to the Spanish throne Carloctavismo also has its own branch of the Spanish Order of the Golden Fleece. For a list of the Knights of the Carloctaviste branch of the Spanish Golden Fleece (1943 to present) see :fr:Liste des chevaliers de l'ordre de la Toison d'or#Ordre carloctaviste de la Toison d'Or

Napoleon's project to merge the Spanish and Austrian branches of the order

On 15 August 1809, Napoleon Bonaparte planned the creation of a new order which would receive the name of Ordre des Trois Toisons d'Or (Order of the Three Golden Fleece). It was planned to merge the Spanish and Austrian branches and to extend the order to France, and to reflect this merger in a design made up of three copies of the golden fleece of the pre-existing orders, in which design would also be shown the French Imperial (Napoleonic) Eagle. It was projected that the order would count a maximum of 100 Grand Knights, and would include two new categories of 400 Commanders and 1000 Knights. However Napoleon's project never materialized.

Notes

References

Bibliography
Knights of the Golden Fleece

Golden Fleece